

580001–580100 

|-bgcolor=#E9E9E9
| 580001 ||  || — || January 14, 2015 || Haleakala || Pan-STARRS ||  || align=right | 1.3 km || 
|-id=002 bgcolor=#E9E9E9
| 580002 ||  || — || September 11, 2004 || Kitt Peak || Spacewatch ||  || align=right | 1.4 km || 
|-id=003 bgcolor=#E9E9E9
| 580003 ||  || — || October 3, 2013 || Mount Lemmon || Mount Lemmon Survey ||  || align=right | 1.2 km || 
|-id=004 bgcolor=#E9E9E9
| 580004 ||  || — || April 5, 2008 || Mount Lemmon || Mount Lemmon Survey ||  || align=right data-sort-value="0.96" | 960 m || 
|-id=005 bgcolor=#E9E9E9
| 580005 ||  || — || October 3, 2013 || Haleakala || Pan-STARRS ||  || align=right | 1.4 km || 
|-id=006 bgcolor=#fefefe
| 580006 ||  || — || September 3, 2013 || Haleakala || Pan-STARRS ||  || align=right data-sort-value="0.59" | 590 m || 
|-id=007 bgcolor=#E9E9E9
| 580007 ||  || — || August 12, 2004 || Cerro Tololo || Cerro Tololo Obs. ||  || align=right | 1.5 km || 
|-id=008 bgcolor=#E9E9E9
| 580008 ||  || — || January 14, 2015 || Haleakala || Pan-STARRS ||  || align=right | 1.7 km || 
|-id=009 bgcolor=#E9E9E9
| 580009 ||  || — || December 21, 2014 || Haleakala || Pan-STARRS ||  || align=right | 1.1 km || 
|-id=010 bgcolor=#E9E9E9
| 580010 ||  || — || December 1, 2005 || Mount Lemmon || Mount Lemmon Survey ||  || align=right | 1.0 km || 
|-id=011 bgcolor=#E9E9E9
| 580011 ||  || — || February 10, 2011 || Mount Lemmon || Mount Lemmon Survey ||  || align=right | 1.4 km || 
|-id=012 bgcolor=#E9E9E9
| 580012 ||  || — || September 1, 2013 || Piszkesteto || K. Sárneczky ||  || align=right | 1.1 km || 
|-id=013 bgcolor=#E9E9E9
| 580013 ||  || — || August 4, 2003 || Kitt Peak || Spacewatch ||  || align=right | 2.4 km || 
|-id=014 bgcolor=#E9E9E9
| 580014 ||  || — || January 17, 2007 || Kitt Peak || Spacewatch ||  || align=right data-sort-value="0.57" | 570 m || 
|-id=015 bgcolor=#E9E9E9
| 580015 ||  || — || November 11, 2009 || Kitt Peak || Spacewatch ||  || align=right data-sort-value="0.86" | 860 m || 
|-id=016 bgcolor=#E9E9E9
| 580016 ||  || — || March 6, 2011 || Mount Lemmon || Mount Lemmon Survey ||  || align=right | 1.0 km || 
|-id=017 bgcolor=#E9E9E9
| 580017 ||  || — || August 30, 2013 || Haleakala || Pan-STARRS ||  || align=right data-sort-value="0.93" | 930 m || 
|-id=018 bgcolor=#fefefe
| 580018 ||  || — || January 14, 2015 || Haleakala || Pan-STARRS ||  || align=right data-sort-value="0.52" | 520 m || 
|-id=019 bgcolor=#E9E9E9
| 580019 ||  || — || December 28, 2005 || Kitt Peak || Spacewatch ||  || align=right | 1.3 km || 
|-id=020 bgcolor=#fefefe
| 580020 ||  || — || February 25, 2012 || Mount Lemmon || Mount Lemmon Survey ||  || align=right data-sort-value="0.57" | 570 m || 
|-id=021 bgcolor=#d6d6d6
| 580021 ||  || — || December 22, 2008 || Kitt Peak || Spacewatch ||  || align=right | 2.5 km || 
|-id=022 bgcolor=#E9E9E9
| 580022 ||  || — || May 3, 2008 || Kitt Peak || Spacewatch ||  || align=right | 1.1 km || 
|-id=023 bgcolor=#E9E9E9
| 580023 ||  || — || December 21, 2014 || Haleakala || Pan-STARRS ||  || align=right | 1.9 km || 
|-id=024 bgcolor=#fefefe
| 580024 ||  || — || November 12, 2006 || Mount Lemmon || Mount Lemmon Survey ||  || align=right data-sort-value="0.74" | 740 m || 
|-id=025 bgcolor=#FA8072
| 580025 ||  || — || January 14, 2015 || Haleakala || Pan-STARRS || H || align=right data-sort-value="0.52" | 520 m || 
|-id=026 bgcolor=#E9E9E9
| 580026 ||  || — || January 30, 2011 || Mount Lemmon || Mount Lemmon Survey ||  || align=right data-sort-value="0.90" | 900 m || 
|-id=027 bgcolor=#E9E9E9
| 580027 ||  || — || April 2, 2011 || Haleakala || Pan-STARRS ||  || align=right | 1.8 km || 
|-id=028 bgcolor=#E9E9E9
| 580028 ||  || — || January 14, 2015 || Haleakala || Pan-STARRS ||  || align=right | 1.2 km || 
|-id=029 bgcolor=#E9E9E9
| 580029 ||  || — || May 12, 2012 || Mount Lemmon || Mount Lemmon Survey ||  || align=right | 1.6 km || 
|-id=030 bgcolor=#E9E9E9
| 580030 ||  || — || January 30, 2011 || Mount Lemmon || Mount Lemmon Survey ||  || align=right data-sort-value="0.87" | 870 m || 
|-id=031 bgcolor=#E9E9E9
| 580031 ||  || — || August 9, 2013 || Kitt Peak || Spacewatch ||  || align=right data-sort-value="0.64" | 640 m || 
|-id=032 bgcolor=#E9E9E9
| 580032 ||  || — || October 1, 2005 || Kitt Peak || Spacewatch ||  || align=right data-sort-value="0.75" | 750 m || 
|-id=033 bgcolor=#fefefe
| 580033 ||  || — || July 4, 2013 || Haleakala || Pan-STARRS ||  || align=right data-sort-value="0.68" | 680 m || 
|-id=034 bgcolor=#E9E9E9
| 580034 ||  || — || January 14, 2015 || Haleakala || Pan-STARRS || EUN || align=right | 1.2 km || 
|-id=035 bgcolor=#E9E9E9
| 580035 ||  || — || May 13, 2012 || Mount Lemmon || Mount Lemmon Survey ||  || align=right | 1.8 km || 
|-id=036 bgcolor=#fefefe
| 580036 ||  || — || November 29, 2014 || Catalina || CSS || H || align=right data-sort-value="0.58" | 580 m || 
|-id=037 bgcolor=#E9E9E9
| 580037 ||  || — || December 6, 2010 || Mount Lemmon || Mount Lemmon Survey ||  || align=right | 1.2 km || 
|-id=038 bgcolor=#FA8072
| 580038 ||  || — || November 4, 2014 || Mount Lemmon || Mount Lemmon Survey || H || align=right data-sort-value="0.43" | 430 m || 
|-id=039 bgcolor=#E9E9E9
| 580039 ||  || — || November 20, 2014 || Haleakala || Pan-STARRS ||  || align=right data-sort-value="0.85" | 850 m || 
|-id=040 bgcolor=#E9E9E9
| 580040 ||  || — || December 3, 2010 || Mount Lemmon || Mount Lemmon Survey ||  || align=right | 1.2 km || 
|-id=041 bgcolor=#E9E9E9
| 580041 ||  || — || December 16, 2014 || Haleakala || Pan-STARRS ||  || align=right data-sort-value="0.73" | 730 m || 
|-id=042 bgcolor=#fefefe
| 580042 ||  || — || January 15, 2015 || Haleakala || Pan-STARRS || H || align=right data-sort-value="0.57" | 570 m || 
|-id=043 bgcolor=#E9E9E9
| 580043 ||  || — || June 11, 2012 || Haleakala || Pan-STARRS ||  || align=right | 1.3 km || 
|-id=044 bgcolor=#E9E9E9
| 580044 ||  || — || January 15, 2015 || Haleakala || Pan-STARRS ||  || align=right | 1.1 km || 
|-id=045 bgcolor=#E9E9E9
| 580045 ||  || — || January 15, 2015 || Haleakala || Pan-STARRS ||  || align=right | 1.3 km || 
|-id=046 bgcolor=#E9E9E9
| 580046 ||  || — || January 15, 2015 || Haleakala || Pan-STARRS ||  || align=right | 1.3 km || 
|-id=047 bgcolor=#E9E9E9
| 580047 ||  || — || December 28, 2014 || Nogales || M. Schwartz, P. R. Holvorcem ||  || align=right | 1.1 km || 
|-id=048 bgcolor=#E9E9E9
| 580048 ||  || — || January 15, 2015 || Haleakala || Pan-STARRS ||  || align=right | 1.3 km || 
|-id=049 bgcolor=#E9E9E9
| 580049 ||  || — || January 15, 2015 || Haleakala || Pan-STARRS ||  || align=right | 1.4 km || 
|-id=050 bgcolor=#d6d6d6
| 580050 ||  || — || October 28, 2008 || Mount Lemmon || Mount Lemmon Survey ||  || align=right | 2.5 km || 
|-id=051 bgcolor=#E9E9E9
| 580051 ||  || — || May 3, 2008 || Kitt Peak || Spacewatch ||  || align=right data-sort-value="0.84" | 840 m || 
|-id=052 bgcolor=#E9E9E9
| 580052 ||  || — || November 26, 2014 || Haleakala || Pan-STARRS ||  || align=right | 2.0 km || 
|-id=053 bgcolor=#E9E9E9
| 580053 ||  || — || October 9, 2008 || Mount Lemmon || Mount Lemmon Survey ||  || align=right | 2.2 km || 
|-id=054 bgcolor=#fefefe
| 580054 ||  || — || November 7, 2007 || Kitt Peak || Spacewatch ||  || align=right data-sort-value="0.65" | 650 m || 
|-id=055 bgcolor=#E9E9E9
| 580055 ||  || — || January 15, 2015 || Haleakala || Pan-STARRS ||  || align=right | 1.1 km || 
|-id=056 bgcolor=#E9E9E9
| 580056 ||  || — || December 25, 2005 || Kitt Peak || Spacewatch ||  || align=right | 1.7 km || 
|-id=057 bgcolor=#E9E9E9
| 580057 ||  || — || January 15, 2015 || Haleakala || Pan-STARRS ||  || align=right | 1.9 km || 
|-id=058 bgcolor=#fefefe
| 580058 ||  || — || February 3, 1997 || Kitt Peak || Spacewatch || H || align=right data-sort-value="0.47" | 470 m || 
|-id=059 bgcolor=#E9E9E9
| 580059 ||  || — || October 18, 2009 || Mount Lemmon || Mount Lemmon Survey ||  || align=right | 1.1 km || 
|-id=060 bgcolor=#E9E9E9
| 580060 ||  || — || November 25, 2005 || Kitt Peak || Spacewatch ||  || align=right | 1.5 km || 
|-id=061 bgcolor=#E9E9E9
| 580061 ||  || — || December 18, 2009 || Mount Lemmon || Mount Lemmon Survey ||  || align=right | 1.8 km || 
|-id=062 bgcolor=#E9E9E9
| 580062 ||  || — || April 15, 2007 || Catalina || CSS ||  || align=right | 2.0 km || 
|-id=063 bgcolor=#E9E9E9
| 580063 ||  || — || January 15, 2015 || Haleakala || Pan-STARRS ||  || align=right data-sort-value="0.95" | 950 m || 
|-id=064 bgcolor=#E9E9E9
| 580064 ||  || — || January 15, 2015 || Haleakala || Pan-STARRS ||  || align=right | 1.0 km || 
|-id=065 bgcolor=#E9E9E9
| 580065 ||  || — || January 15, 2015 || Haleakala || Pan-STARRS ||  || align=right | 1.8 km || 
|-id=066 bgcolor=#E9E9E9
| 580066 ||  || — || November 11, 2001 || Apache Point || SDSS Collaboration ||  || align=right | 1.1 km || 
|-id=067 bgcolor=#E9E9E9
| 580067 ||  || — || November 29, 2014 || Kitt Peak || Spacewatch ||  || align=right | 1.9 km || 
|-id=068 bgcolor=#fefefe
| 580068 ||  || — || November 2, 2007 || Kitt Peak || Spacewatch ||  || align=right data-sort-value="0.71" | 710 m || 
|-id=069 bgcolor=#E9E9E9
| 580069 ||  || — || October 25, 2005 || Kitt Peak || Spacewatch ||  || align=right | 1.5 km || 
|-id=070 bgcolor=#fefefe
| 580070 ||  || — || November 23, 2014 || Haleakala || Pan-STARRS || H || align=right data-sort-value="0.81" | 810 m || 
|-id=071 bgcolor=#E9E9E9
| 580071 ||  || — || January 14, 2015 || Haleakala || Pan-STARRS ||  || align=right | 1.1 km || 
|-id=072 bgcolor=#d6d6d6
| 580072 ||  || — || December 16, 2004 || Kitt Peak || Spacewatch ||  || align=right | 2.8 km || 
|-id=073 bgcolor=#E9E9E9
| 580073 ||  || — || November 20, 2014 || Haleakala || Pan-STARRS ||  || align=right | 1.7 km || 
|-id=074 bgcolor=#E9E9E9
| 580074 ||  || — || May 20, 2012 || Mount Lemmon || Mount Lemmon Survey ||  || align=right | 2.7 km || 
|-id=075 bgcolor=#C2FFFF
| 580075 ||  || — || September 14, 2013 || Haleakala || Pan-STARRS || L5 || align=right | 6.7 km || 
|-id=076 bgcolor=#E9E9E9
| 580076 ||  || — || January 15, 2015 || Haleakala || Pan-STARRS ||  || align=right | 1.3 km || 
|-id=077 bgcolor=#E9E9E9
| 580077 ||  || — || October 6, 2012 || Oukaimeden || C. Rinner ||  || align=right | 3.0 km || 
|-id=078 bgcolor=#d6d6d6
| 580078 ||  || — || October 8, 2008 || Kitt Peak || Spacewatch ||  || align=right | 2.1 km || 
|-id=079 bgcolor=#fefefe
| 580079 ||  || — || December 8, 2010 || Mount Lemmon || Mount Lemmon Survey ||  || align=right data-sort-value="0.90" | 900 m || 
|-id=080 bgcolor=#E9E9E9
| 580080 ||  || — || January 5, 2006 || Kitt Peak || Spacewatch ||  || align=right | 1.8 km || 
|-id=081 bgcolor=#E9E9E9
| 580081 ||  || — || November 25, 2009 || Kitt Peak || Spacewatch ||  || align=right | 1.5 km || 
|-id=082 bgcolor=#E9E9E9
| 580082 ||  || — || September 29, 2009 || Mount Lemmon || Mount Lemmon Survey ||  || align=right | 1.00 km || 
|-id=083 bgcolor=#E9E9E9
| 580083 ||  || — || March 8, 2008 || Mount Lemmon || Mount Lemmon Survey ||  || align=right data-sort-value="0.99" | 990 m || 
|-id=084 bgcolor=#E9E9E9
| 580084 ||  || — || February 5, 2011 || Mount Lemmon || Mount Lemmon Survey ||  || align=right | 1.3 km || 
|-id=085 bgcolor=#E9E9E9
| 580085 ||  || — || April 20, 2007 || Kitt Peak || Spacewatch ||  || align=right | 2.1 km || 
|-id=086 bgcolor=#E9E9E9
| 580086 ||  || — || February 1, 2003 || Palomar || NEAT ||  || align=right | 1.2 km || 
|-id=087 bgcolor=#E9E9E9
| 580087 ||  || — || November 16, 2014 || Mount Lemmon || Mount Lemmon Survey ||  || align=right | 1.5 km || 
|-id=088 bgcolor=#E9E9E9
| 580088 ||  || — || August 5, 2008 || La Sagra || OAM Obs. ||  || align=right | 1.6 km || 
|-id=089 bgcolor=#fefefe
| 580089 ||  || — || January 15, 2015 || Haleakala || Pan-STARRS || H || align=right data-sort-value="0.58" | 580 m || 
|-id=090 bgcolor=#FA8072
| 580090 ||  || — || January 12, 2010 || Catalina || CSS || H || align=right data-sort-value="0.47" | 470 m || 
|-id=091 bgcolor=#fefefe
| 580091 ||  || — || November 28, 2011 || Kitt Peak || Spacewatch || H || align=right data-sort-value="0.68" | 680 m || 
|-id=092 bgcolor=#fefefe
| 580092 ||  || — || September 15, 2006 || Socorro || LINEAR ||  || align=right data-sort-value="0.99" | 990 m || 
|-id=093 bgcolor=#E9E9E9
| 580093 ||  || — || January 12, 2015 || Haleakala || Pan-STARRS ||  || align=right | 2.4 km || 
|-id=094 bgcolor=#E9E9E9
| 580094 ||  || — || January 14, 2015 || Haleakala || Pan-STARRS ||  || align=right | 1.7 km || 
|-id=095 bgcolor=#fefefe
| 580095 ||  || — || May 30, 2003 || Socorro || LINEAR || H || align=right data-sort-value="0.74" | 740 m || 
|-id=096 bgcolor=#E9E9E9
| 580096 ||  || — || October 27, 2009 || Mount Lemmon || Mount Lemmon Survey ||  || align=right | 1.6 km || 
|-id=097 bgcolor=#E9E9E9
| 580097 ||  || — || March 31, 2012 || Mount Lemmon || Mount Lemmon Survey ||  || align=right data-sort-value="0.87" | 870 m || 
|-id=098 bgcolor=#E9E9E9
| 580098 ||  || — || January 14, 2015 || Haleakala || Pan-STARRS ||  || align=right data-sort-value="0.80" | 800 m || 
|-id=099 bgcolor=#fefefe
| 580099 ||  || — || January 15, 2015 || Haleakala || Pan-STARRS ||  || align=right data-sort-value="0.71" | 710 m || 
|-id=100 bgcolor=#E9E9E9
| 580100 ||  || — || January 15, 2015 || Haleakala || Pan-STARRS ||  || align=right | 1.4 km || 
|}

580101–580200 

|-bgcolor=#E9E9E9
| 580101 ||  || — || January 9, 2015 || Haleakala || Pan-STARRS ||  || align=right data-sort-value="0.76" | 760 m || 
|-id=102 bgcolor=#E9E9E9
| 580102 ||  || — || December 9, 2001 || Kitt Peak || Spacewatch ||  || align=right | 1.9 km || 
|-id=103 bgcolor=#E9E9E9
| 580103 ||  || — || September 3, 2013 || Haleakala || Pan-STARRS ||  || align=right data-sort-value="0.81" | 810 m || 
|-id=104 bgcolor=#d6d6d6
| 580104 ||  || — || June 14, 2013 || Mount Lemmon || Mount Lemmon Survey ||  || align=right | 2.4 km || 
|-id=105 bgcolor=#fefefe
| 580105 ||  || — || November 22, 2006 || Catalina || CSS ||  || align=right data-sort-value="0.78" | 780 m || 
|-id=106 bgcolor=#E9E9E9
| 580106 ||  || — || March 16, 2007 || Kitt Peak || Spacewatch ||  || align=right | 1.3 km || 
|-id=107 bgcolor=#E9E9E9
| 580107 ||  || — || January 16, 2015 || Haleakala || Pan-STARRS ||  || align=right | 1.8 km || 
|-id=108 bgcolor=#FA8072
| 580108 ||  || — || July 30, 2001 || Palomar || NEAT || H || align=right data-sort-value="0.66" | 660 m || 
|-id=109 bgcolor=#FFC2E0
| 580109 ||  || — || October 2, 2014 || Haleakala || Pan-STARRS || AMO || align=right data-sort-value="0.28" | 280 m || 
|-id=110 bgcolor=#E9E9E9
| 580110 ||  || — || December 14, 2006 || Kitt Peak || Spacewatch ||  || align=right data-sort-value="0.94" | 940 m || 
|-id=111 bgcolor=#E9E9E9
| 580111 ||  || — || January 8, 2011 || Mount Lemmon || Mount Lemmon Survey ||  || align=right data-sort-value="0.75" | 750 m || 
|-id=112 bgcolor=#fefefe
| 580112 ||  || — || October 10, 2007 || Kitt Peak || Spacewatch ||  || align=right data-sort-value="0.57" | 570 m || 
|-id=113 bgcolor=#E9E9E9
| 580113 ||  || — || January 13, 2011 || Mount Lemmon || Mount Lemmon Survey ||  || align=right data-sort-value="0.95" | 950 m || 
|-id=114 bgcolor=#E9E9E9
| 580114 ||  || — || September 10, 2004 || Kitt Peak || Spacewatch ||  || align=right | 1.4 km || 
|-id=115 bgcolor=#E9E9E9
| 580115 ||  || — || January 26, 1998 || Kitt Peak || Spacewatch ||  || align=right | 1.5 km || 
|-id=116 bgcolor=#E9E9E9
| 580116 ||  || — || April 23, 2004 || Kitt Peak || Spacewatch ||  || align=right | 1.0 km || 
|-id=117 bgcolor=#E9E9E9
| 580117 ||  || — || November 26, 2014 || Haleakala || Pan-STARRS ||  || align=right data-sort-value="0.97" | 970 m || 
|-id=118 bgcolor=#E9E9E9
| 580118 ||  || — || February 8, 2011 || Mount Lemmon || Mount Lemmon Survey ||  || align=right | 1.7 km || 
|-id=119 bgcolor=#E9E9E9
| 580119 ||  || — || April 18, 2007 || Mount Lemmon || Mount Lemmon Survey ||  || align=right | 2.2 km || 
|-id=120 bgcolor=#E9E9E9
| 580120 ||  || — || May 4, 2008 || Kitt Peak || Spacewatch ||  || align=right | 1.2 km || 
|-id=121 bgcolor=#E9E9E9
| 580121 ||  || — || February 1, 2011 || Piszkesteto || K. Sárneczky ||  || align=right | 2.1 km || 
|-id=122 bgcolor=#E9E9E9
| 580122 ||  || — || January 16, 2015 || Kitt Peak || Spacewatch ||  || align=right | 2.4 km || 
|-id=123 bgcolor=#E9E9E9
| 580123 Gedek ||  ||  || September 8, 2012 || Tincana || M. Żołnowski, M. Kusiak ||  || align=right | 2.5 km || 
|-id=124 bgcolor=#E9E9E9
| 580124 ||  || — || December 2, 2005 || Mount Lemmon || Mount Lemmon Survey ||  || align=right | 1.3 km || 
|-id=125 bgcolor=#fefefe
| 580125 ||  || — || December 28, 2014 || Mount Lemmon || Mount Lemmon Survey || H || align=right data-sort-value="0.62" | 620 m || 
|-id=126 bgcolor=#fefefe
| 580126 ||  || — || November 18, 2006 || Mount Lemmon || Mount Lemmon Survey ||  || align=right data-sort-value="0.84" | 840 m || 
|-id=127 bgcolor=#d6d6d6
| 580127 ||  || — || October 9, 2008 || Kitt Peak || Spacewatch ||  || align=right | 2.1 km || 
|-id=128 bgcolor=#fefefe
| 580128 ||  || — || September 20, 2003 || Palomar || NEAT || H || align=right data-sort-value="0.75" | 750 m || 
|-id=129 bgcolor=#E9E9E9
| 580129 ||  || — || November 11, 2013 || Kitt Peak || Spacewatch ||  || align=right | 2.0 km || 
|-id=130 bgcolor=#E9E9E9
| 580130 ||  || — || January 9, 2011 || Mount Lemmon || Mount Lemmon Survey ||  || align=right | 1.3 km || 
|-id=131 bgcolor=#E9E9E9
| 580131 ||  || — || September 4, 2008 || Kitt Peak || Spacewatch ||  || align=right | 1.3 km || 
|-id=132 bgcolor=#d6d6d6
| 580132 ||  || — || September 9, 2008 || Mount Lemmon || Mount Lemmon Survey ||  || align=right | 1.7 km || 
|-id=133 bgcolor=#E9E9E9
| 580133 ||  || — || December 15, 2001 || Apache Point || SDSS Collaboration ||  || align=right | 1.2 km || 
|-id=134 bgcolor=#E9E9E9
| 580134 ||  || — || July 29, 2008 || Kitt Peak || Spacewatch ||  || align=right | 1.7 km || 
|-id=135 bgcolor=#E9E9E9
| 580135 ||  || — || March 14, 2011 || Mount Lemmon || Mount Lemmon Survey ||  || align=right | 1.1 km || 
|-id=136 bgcolor=#E9E9E9
| 580136 ||  || — || January 16, 2015 || Haleakala || Pan-STARRS ||  || align=right | 1.5 km || 
|-id=137 bgcolor=#E9E9E9
| 580137 ||  || — || August 12, 2013 || Elena Remote || A. Oreshko ||  || align=right | 1.6 km || 
|-id=138 bgcolor=#E9E9E9
| 580138 ||  || — || February 13, 2011 || Mount Lemmon || Mount Lemmon Survey ||  || align=right | 1.5 km || 
|-id=139 bgcolor=#d6d6d6
| 580139 ||  || — || November 25, 2013 || XuYi || PMO NEO ||  || align=right | 2.9 km || 
|-id=140 bgcolor=#E9E9E9
| 580140 ||  || — || August 23, 2003 || Palomar || NEAT ||  || align=right | 2.0 km || 
|-id=141 bgcolor=#E9E9E9
| 580141 ||  || — || January 16, 2015 || Haleakala || Pan-STARRS ||  || align=right | 2.4 km || 
|-id=142 bgcolor=#E9E9E9
| 580142 ||  || — || January 16, 2015 || Haleakala || Pan-STARRS ||  || align=right | 2.3 km || 
|-id=143 bgcolor=#fefefe
| 580143 ||  || — || January 20, 2012 || Kitt Peak || Spacewatch || H || align=right data-sort-value="0.73" | 730 m || 
|-id=144 bgcolor=#E9E9E9
| 580144 ||  || — || September 23, 2008 || Kitt Peak || Spacewatch ||  || align=right | 2.0 km || 
|-id=145 bgcolor=#E9E9E9
| 580145 ||  || — || September 3, 2005 || Catalina || CSS ||  || align=right | 1.1 km || 
|-id=146 bgcolor=#E9E9E9
| 580146 ||  || — || January 28, 2003 || Palomar || NEAT ||  || align=right | 1.1 km || 
|-id=147 bgcolor=#E9E9E9
| 580147 ||  || — || October 10, 2005 || Kitt Peak || Spacewatch ||  || align=right | 1.2 km || 
|-id=148 bgcolor=#E9E9E9
| 580148 ||  || — || September 1, 2013 || Mount Lemmon || Mount Lemmon Survey ||  || align=right | 2.1 km || 
|-id=149 bgcolor=#E9E9E9
| 580149 ||  || — || January 13, 2011 || Mount Lemmon || Mount Lemmon Survey ||  || align=right | 1.1 km || 
|-id=150 bgcolor=#E9E9E9
| 580150 ||  || — || March 14, 2007 || Mount Lemmon || Mount Lemmon Survey ||  || align=right | 1.9 km || 
|-id=151 bgcolor=#E9E9E9
| 580151 ||  || — || September 15, 2013 || Haleakala || Pan-STARRS ||  || align=right | 1.7 km || 
|-id=152 bgcolor=#E9E9E9
| 580152 ||  || — || December 27, 2006 || Mount Lemmon || Mount Lemmon Survey ||  || align=right data-sort-value="0.97" | 970 m || 
|-id=153 bgcolor=#E9E9E9
| 580153 ||  || — || August 30, 2005 || Palomar || NEAT ||  || align=right | 1.1 km || 
|-id=154 bgcolor=#fefefe
| 580154 ||  || — || February 26, 2012 || Haleakala || Pan-STARRS ||  || align=right data-sort-value="0.75" | 750 m || 
|-id=155 bgcolor=#E9E9E9
| 580155 ||  || — || January 17, 2015 || Haleakala || Pan-STARRS ||  || align=right | 1.5 km || 
|-id=156 bgcolor=#E9E9E9
| 580156 ||  || — || October 7, 2005 || Mauna Kea || Mauna Kea Obs. ||  || align=right | 2.4 km || 
|-id=157 bgcolor=#E9E9E9
| 580157 ||  || — || December 17, 2009 || Kitt Peak || Spacewatch ||  || align=right | 1.9 km || 
|-id=158 bgcolor=#E9E9E9
| 580158 ||  || — || September 4, 2008 || Kitt Peak || Spacewatch ||  || align=right | 2.3 km || 
|-id=159 bgcolor=#d6d6d6
| 580159 ||  || — || January 6, 2010 || Mount Lemmon || Mount Lemmon Survey ||  || align=right | 1.7 km || 
|-id=160 bgcolor=#E9E9E9
| 580160 ||  || — || February 13, 2011 || Mount Lemmon || Mount Lemmon Survey ||  || align=right | 1.2 km || 
|-id=161 bgcolor=#E9E9E9
| 580161 ||  || — || March 9, 2007 || Kitt Peak || Spacewatch ||  || align=right | 1.5 km || 
|-id=162 bgcolor=#E9E9E9
| 580162 ||  || — || January 17, 2015 || Haleakala || Pan-STARRS ||  || align=right | 1.2 km || 
|-id=163 bgcolor=#E9E9E9
| 580163 ||  || — || February 4, 2006 || Mount Lemmon || Mount Lemmon Survey ||  || align=right | 1.8 km || 
|-id=164 bgcolor=#E9E9E9
| 580164 ||  || — || January 17, 2015 || Haleakala || Pan-STARRS ||  || align=right data-sort-value="0.80" | 800 m || 
|-id=165 bgcolor=#fefefe
| 580165 ||  || — || January 17, 2015 || Haleakala || Pan-STARRS || H || align=right data-sort-value="0.50" | 500 m || 
|-id=166 bgcolor=#E9E9E9
| 580166 ||  || — || November 11, 2013 || Mount Lemmon || Mount Lemmon Survey ||  || align=right | 1.3 km || 
|-id=167 bgcolor=#E9E9E9
| 580167 ||  || — || November 25, 2005 || Mount Lemmon || Mount Lemmon Survey ||  || align=right | 2.3 km || 
|-id=168 bgcolor=#E9E9E9
| 580168 ||  || — || January 17, 2015 || Haleakala || Pan-STARRS ||  || align=right | 1.8 km || 
|-id=169 bgcolor=#E9E9E9
| 580169 ||  || — || June 18, 2012 || Mount Lemmon || Mount Lemmon Survey ||  || align=right | 1.4 km || 
|-id=170 bgcolor=#d6d6d6
| 580170 ||  || — || March 11, 2005 || Kitt Peak || Spacewatch ||  || align=right | 1.9 km || 
|-id=171 bgcolor=#E9E9E9
| 580171 ||  || — || March 14, 2011 || Mount Lemmon || Mount Lemmon Survey ||  || align=right | 1.7 km || 
|-id=172 bgcolor=#E9E9E9
| 580172 ||  || — || December 25, 2005 || Mount Lemmon || Mount Lemmon Survey ||  || align=right | 1.5 km || 
|-id=173 bgcolor=#d6d6d6
| 580173 ||  || — || October 28, 2008 || Kitt Peak || Spacewatch ||  || align=right | 2.0 km || 
|-id=174 bgcolor=#E9E9E9
| 580174 ||  || — || January 17, 2015 || Haleakala || Pan-STARRS ||  || align=right | 2.0 km || 
|-id=175 bgcolor=#E9E9E9
| 580175 ||  || — || January 17, 2015 || Haleakala || Pan-STARRS ||  || align=right | 1.1 km || 
|-id=176 bgcolor=#E9E9E9
| 580176 ||  || — || January 18, 2015 || ESA OGS || ESA OGS ||  || align=right | 1.9 km || 
|-id=177 bgcolor=#E9E9E9
| 580177 ||  || — || September 14, 2013 || Kitt Peak || Spacewatch ||  || align=right | 1.8 km || 
|-id=178 bgcolor=#fefefe
| 580178 ||  || — || February 20, 2009 || Kitt Peak || Spacewatch ||  || align=right data-sort-value="0.54" | 540 m || 
|-id=179 bgcolor=#E9E9E9
| 580179 ||  || — || January 13, 2011 || Mount Lemmon || Mount Lemmon Survey ||  || align=right data-sort-value="0.87" | 870 m || 
|-id=180 bgcolor=#E9E9E9
| 580180 ||  || — || February 9, 2011 || Mount Lemmon || Mount Lemmon Survey ||  || align=right data-sort-value="0.73" | 730 m || 
|-id=181 bgcolor=#E9E9E9
| 580181 ||  || — || January 18, 2015 || Haleakala || Pan-STARRS ||  || align=right | 2.0 km || 
|-id=182 bgcolor=#E9E9E9
| 580182 ||  || — || September 5, 1999 || Catalina || CSS ||  || align=right | 3.2 km || 
|-id=183 bgcolor=#E9E9E9
| 580183 ||  || — || January 18, 2015 || Haleakala || Pan-STARRS ||  || align=right | 1.1 km || 
|-id=184 bgcolor=#E9E9E9
| 580184 ||  || — || January 18, 2015 || Haleakala || Pan-STARRS ||  || align=right | 1.8 km || 
|-id=185 bgcolor=#fefefe
| 580185 ||  || — || January 11, 2008 || Kitt Peak || Spacewatch ||  || align=right data-sort-value="0.62" | 620 m || 
|-id=186 bgcolor=#E9E9E9
| 580186 ||  || — || January 18, 2015 || Haleakala || Pan-STARRS ||  || align=right | 1.6 km || 
|-id=187 bgcolor=#d6d6d6
| 580187 ||  || — || October 23, 2008 || Kitt Peak || Spacewatch ||  || align=right | 2.2 km || 
|-id=188 bgcolor=#d6d6d6
| 580188 ||  || — || January 18, 2015 || Mount Lemmon || Mount Lemmon Survey ||  || align=right | 1.9 km || 
|-id=189 bgcolor=#E9E9E9
| 580189 ||  || — || June 30, 2008 || Kitt Peak || Spacewatch ||  || align=right | 1.5 km || 
|-id=190 bgcolor=#d6d6d6
| 580190 ||  || — || October 28, 2008 || Kitt Peak || Spacewatch ||  || align=right | 1.9 km || 
|-id=191 bgcolor=#E9E9E9
| 580191 ||  || — || January 18, 2015 || Haleakala || Pan-STARRS ||  || align=right | 1.6 km || 
|-id=192 bgcolor=#fefefe
| 580192 ||  || — || December 5, 2010 || Mount Lemmon || Mount Lemmon Survey ||  || align=right data-sort-value="0.75" | 750 m || 
|-id=193 bgcolor=#FA8072
| 580193 ||  || — || July 8, 2003 || Palomar || NEAT || H || align=right data-sort-value="0.70" | 700 m || 
|-id=194 bgcolor=#E9E9E9
| 580194 ||  || — || December 31, 2005 || Kitt Peak || Spacewatch ||  || align=right | 2.1 km || 
|-id=195 bgcolor=#E9E9E9
| 580195 ||  || — || October 9, 2010 || Mount Lemmon || Mount Lemmon Survey ||  || align=right | 1.2 km || 
|-id=196 bgcolor=#fefefe
| 580196 ||  || — || January 16, 2015 || Mount Lemmon || Mount Lemmon Survey || H || align=right data-sort-value="0.64" | 640 m || 
|-id=197 bgcolor=#E9E9E9
| 580197 ||  || — || January 14, 2011 || Kitt Peak || Spacewatch ||  || align=right data-sort-value="0.75" | 750 m || 
|-id=198 bgcolor=#E9E9E9
| 580198 ||  || — || March 5, 2011 || Mount Lemmon || Mount Lemmon Survey ||  || align=right data-sort-value="0.98" | 980 m || 
|-id=199 bgcolor=#E9E9E9
| 580199 ||  || — || January 16, 2015 || Mount Lemmon || Mount Lemmon Survey ||  || align=right data-sort-value="0.87" | 870 m || 
|-id=200 bgcolor=#E9E9E9
| 580200 ||  || — || October 8, 2008 || Mount Lemmon || Mount Lemmon Survey ||  || align=right | 2.7 km || 
|}

580201–580300 

|-bgcolor=#E9E9E9
| 580201 ||  || — || May 29, 2008 || Mount Lemmon || Mount Lemmon Survey ||  || align=right | 1.7 km || 
|-id=202 bgcolor=#d6d6d6
| 580202 ||  || — || January 16, 2015 || Haleakala || Pan-STARRS ||  || align=right | 2.7 km || 
|-id=203 bgcolor=#E9E9E9
| 580203 ||  || — || October 9, 2013 || Mount Lemmon || Mount Lemmon Survey ||  || align=right data-sort-value="0.83" | 830 m || 
|-id=204 bgcolor=#E9E9E9
| 580204 ||  || — || January 16, 2015 || Haleakala || Pan-STARRS ||  || align=right data-sort-value="0.90" | 900 m || 
|-id=205 bgcolor=#d6d6d6
| 580205 ||  || — || October 26, 2008 || Mount Lemmon || Mount Lemmon Survey ||  || align=right | 2.7 km || 
|-id=206 bgcolor=#E9E9E9
| 580206 ||  || — || December 21, 2014 || Haleakala || Pan-STARRS ||  || align=right | 1.6 km || 
|-id=207 bgcolor=#E9E9E9
| 580207 ||  || — || November 27, 2014 || Mount Lemmon || Mount Lemmon Survey ||  || align=right | 1.6 km || 
|-id=208 bgcolor=#E9E9E9
| 580208 ||  || — || October 2, 2009 || Mount Lemmon || Mount Lemmon Survey ||  || align=right | 2.0 km || 
|-id=209 bgcolor=#E9E9E9
| 580209 ||  || — || November 17, 2009 || Mount Lemmon || Mount Lemmon Survey ||  || align=right | 1.8 km || 
|-id=210 bgcolor=#E9E9E9
| 580210 ||  || — || November 21, 2014 || Haleakala || Pan-STARRS ||  || align=right data-sort-value="0.70" | 700 m || 
|-id=211 bgcolor=#E9E9E9
| 580211 ||  || — || March 1, 2011 || Mount Lemmon || Mount Lemmon Survey ||  || align=right | 1.6 km || 
|-id=212 bgcolor=#E9E9E9
| 580212 ||  || — || May 1, 2011 || Haleakala || Pan-STARRS || GEF || align=right data-sort-value="0.96" | 960 m || 
|-id=213 bgcolor=#fefefe
| 580213 ||  || — || January 17, 2015 || Haleakala || Pan-STARRS ||  || align=right data-sort-value="0.65" | 650 m || 
|-id=214 bgcolor=#E9E9E9
| 580214 ||  || — || August 18, 2003 || Haleakala || AMOS ||  || align=right | 3.1 km || 
|-id=215 bgcolor=#E9E9E9
| 580215 ||  || — || April 23, 2007 || Mount Lemmon || Mount Lemmon Survey ||  || align=right | 1.8 km || 
|-id=216 bgcolor=#E9E9E9
| 580216 ||  || — || January 17, 2015 || Haleakala || Pan-STARRS ||  || align=right | 1.7 km || 
|-id=217 bgcolor=#E9E9E9
| 580217 ||  || — || September 11, 2001 || Socorro || LINEAR ||  || align=right data-sort-value="0.78" | 780 m || 
|-id=218 bgcolor=#E9E9E9
| 580218 ||  || — || December 5, 2005 || Kitt Peak || Spacewatch ||  || align=right | 1.5 km || 
|-id=219 bgcolor=#E9E9E9
| 580219 ||  || — || March 11, 2007 || Mount Lemmon || Mount Lemmon Survey ||  || align=right | 1.0 km || 
|-id=220 bgcolor=#fefefe
| 580220 ||  || — || July 1, 2013 || Haleakala || Pan-STARRS ||  || align=right data-sort-value="0.65" | 650 m || 
|-id=221 bgcolor=#fefefe
| 580221 ||  || — || March 28, 2008 || Mount Lemmon || Mount Lemmon Survey || MAS || align=right data-sort-value="0.57" | 570 m || 
|-id=222 bgcolor=#E9E9E9
| 580222 ||  || — || February 10, 2002 || Socorro || LINEAR ||  || align=right | 1.5 km || 
|-id=223 bgcolor=#E9E9E9
| 580223 ||  || — || November 3, 2005 || Mount Lemmon || Mount Lemmon Survey ||  || align=right data-sort-value="0.78" | 780 m || 
|-id=224 bgcolor=#E9E9E9
| 580224 ||  || — || January 17, 2015 || Haleakala || Pan-STARRS ||  || align=right | 2.0 km || 
|-id=225 bgcolor=#E9E9E9
| 580225 ||  || — || October 26, 2013 || Mount Lemmon || Mount Lemmon Survey ||  || align=right | 1.7 km || 
|-id=226 bgcolor=#d6d6d6
| 580226 ||  || — || October 20, 2003 || Kitt Peak || Spacewatch ||  || align=right | 2.0 km || 
|-id=227 bgcolor=#E9E9E9
| 580227 ||  || — || April 4, 2011 || Catalina || CSS || EUN || align=right | 1.4 km || 
|-id=228 bgcolor=#E9E9E9
| 580228 ||  || — || October 24, 2013 || Mount Lemmon || Mount Lemmon Survey ||  || align=right | 1.3 km || 
|-id=229 bgcolor=#E9E9E9
| 580229 ||  || — || August 5, 2008 || Siding Spring || SSS ||  || align=right | 1.4 km || 
|-id=230 bgcolor=#E9E9E9
| 580230 ||  || — || March 20, 2007 || Kitt Peak || Spacewatch ||  || align=right | 1.3 km || 
|-id=231 bgcolor=#E9E9E9
| 580231 ||  || — || January 17, 2015 || Haleakala || Pan-STARRS ||  || align=right | 1.2 km || 
|-id=232 bgcolor=#E9E9E9
| 580232 ||  || — || March 12, 2007 || Catalina || CSS ||  || align=right | 1.4 km || 
|-id=233 bgcolor=#E9E9E9
| 580233 ||  || — || November 4, 2004 || Kitt Peak || Spacewatch ||  || align=right | 1.9 km || 
|-id=234 bgcolor=#E9E9E9
| 580234 ||  || — || April 1, 2003 || Cerro Tololo || Cerro Tololo Obs. ||  || align=right | 1.2 km || 
|-id=235 bgcolor=#E9E9E9
| 580235 ||  || — || August 26, 2000 || Cerro Tololo || R. Millis, L. H. Wasserman ||  || align=right | 1.2 km || 
|-id=236 bgcolor=#E9E9E9
| 580236 ||  || — || December 18, 2014 || Haleakala || Pan-STARRS ||  || align=right | 2.1 km || 
|-id=237 bgcolor=#E9E9E9
| 580237 ||  || — || July 8, 2003 || Palomar || NEAT ||  || align=right | 2.2 km || 
|-id=238 bgcolor=#E9E9E9
| 580238 ||  || — || October 3, 2013 || Haleakala || Pan-STARRS ||  || align=right | 1.1 km || 
|-id=239 bgcolor=#E9E9E9
| 580239 ||  || — || January 17, 2015 || Haleakala || Pan-STARRS ||  || align=right | 2.3 km || 
|-id=240 bgcolor=#E9E9E9
| 580240 ||  || — || January 17, 2015 || Haleakala || Pan-STARRS ||  || align=right | 1.9 km || 
|-id=241 bgcolor=#E9E9E9
| 580241 ||  || — || January 17, 2015 || Haleakala || Pan-STARRS ||  || align=right data-sort-value="0.80" | 800 m || 
|-id=242 bgcolor=#E9E9E9
| 580242 ||  || — || January 17, 2015 || Haleakala || Pan-STARRS ||  || align=right | 1.8 km || 
|-id=243 bgcolor=#E9E9E9
| 580243 ||  || — || January 17, 2015 || Haleakala || Pan-STARRS ||  || align=right data-sort-value="0.90" | 900 m || 
|-id=244 bgcolor=#E9E9E9
| 580244 ||  || — || November 16, 2009 || Kitt Peak || Spacewatch ||  || align=right | 2.1 km || 
|-id=245 bgcolor=#E9E9E9
| 580245 ||  || — || October 23, 2003 || Kitt Peak || Spacewatch ||  || align=right | 2.4 km || 
|-id=246 bgcolor=#fefefe
| 580246 ||  || — || May 14, 2009 || Kitt Peak || Spacewatch || (883) || align=right data-sort-value="0.90" | 900 m || 
|-id=247 bgcolor=#E9E9E9
| 580247 ||  || — || November 27, 2014 || Haleakala || Pan-STARRS ||  || align=right | 2.1 km || 
|-id=248 bgcolor=#fefefe
| 580248 ||  || — || April 6, 2008 || Mount Lemmon || Mount Lemmon Survey ||  || align=right data-sort-value="0.89" | 890 m || 
|-id=249 bgcolor=#fefefe
| 580249 ||  || — || August 30, 2005 || Palomar || NEAT ||  || align=right data-sort-value="0.98" | 980 m || 
|-id=250 bgcolor=#E9E9E9
| 580250 ||  || — || September 15, 2013 || Mount Lemmon || Mount Lemmon Survey ||  || align=right | 1.0 km || 
|-id=251 bgcolor=#E9E9E9
| 580251 ||  || — || December 25, 2005 || Kitt Peak || Spacewatch ||  || align=right | 1.4 km || 
|-id=252 bgcolor=#E9E9E9
| 580252 ||  || — || July 15, 2013 || Mauna Kea || Mauna Kea Obs. ||  || align=right | 1.8 km || 
|-id=253 bgcolor=#E9E9E9
| 580253 ||  || — || July 29, 2000 || Anderson Mesa || LONEOS || EUN || align=right | 1.3 km || 
|-id=254 bgcolor=#fefefe
| 580254 ||  || — || December 16, 2007 || Kitt Peak || Spacewatch ||  || align=right data-sort-value="0.59" | 590 m || 
|-id=255 bgcolor=#E9E9E9
| 580255 ||  || — || March 31, 2011 || Haleakala || Pan-STARRS ||  || align=right | 2.1 km || 
|-id=256 bgcolor=#d6d6d6
| 580256 ||  || — || March 13, 2010 || Kitt Peak || Spacewatch ||  || align=right | 1.9 km || 
|-id=257 bgcolor=#E9E9E9
| 580257 ||  || — || January 17, 2015 || Haleakala || Pan-STARRS ||  || align=right | 1.3 km || 
|-id=258 bgcolor=#fefefe
| 580258 ||  || — || November 20, 2003 || Kitt Peak || Kitt Peak Obs. ||  || align=right data-sort-value="0.50" | 500 m || 
|-id=259 bgcolor=#E9E9E9
| 580259 ||  || — || January 17, 2015 || Haleakala || Pan-STARRS ||  || align=right | 1.7 km || 
|-id=260 bgcolor=#E9E9E9
| 580260 ||  || — || April 19, 2002 || Kitt Peak || Spacewatch ||  || align=right | 1.5 km || 
|-id=261 bgcolor=#E9E9E9
| 580261 ||  || — || January 17, 2015 || Haleakala || Pan-STARRS ||  || align=right | 1.6 km || 
|-id=262 bgcolor=#E9E9E9
| 580262 ||  || — || September 14, 2013 || Mount Lemmon || Mount Lemmon Survey ||  || align=right | 1.8 km || 
|-id=263 bgcolor=#E9E9E9
| 580263 ||  || — || October 11, 2001 || Socorro || LINEAR || (5) || align=right | 1.0 km || 
|-id=264 bgcolor=#E9E9E9
| 580264 ||  || — || November 9, 2009 || Kitt Peak || Spacewatch ||  || align=right | 1.5 km || 
|-id=265 bgcolor=#E9E9E9
| 580265 ||  || — || September 12, 2013 || Catalina || CSS ||  || align=right | 1.4 km || 
|-id=266 bgcolor=#E9E9E9
| 580266 ||  || — || March 9, 2011 || Mount Lemmon || Mount Lemmon Survey ||  || align=right | 1.3 km || 
|-id=267 bgcolor=#E9E9E9
| 580267 ||  || — || October 3, 2013 || Haleakala || Pan-STARRS ||  || align=right | 1.1 km || 
|-id=268 bgcolor=#d6d6d6
| 580268 ||  || — || January 17, 2015 || Haleakala || Pan-STARRS ||  || align=right | 1.8 km || 
|-id=269 bgcolor=#E9E9E9
| 580269 ||  || — || April 27, 2011 || Kitt Peak || Spacewatch ||  || align=right | 1.9 km || 
|-id=270 bgcolor=#E9E9E9
| 580270 ||  || — || September 6, 2013 || Mount Lemmon || Mount Lemmon Survey ||  || align=right | 1.9 km || 
|-id=271 bgcolor=#E9E9E9
| 580271 ||  || — || June 17, 2012 || Mount Lemmon || Mount Lemmon Survey ||  || align=right | 1.6 km || 
|-id=272 bgcolor=#E9E9E9
| 580272 ||  || — || October 24, 2013 || Mount Lemmon || Mount Lemmon Survey ||  || align=right data-sort-value="0.96" | 960 m || 
|-id=273 bgcolor=#E9E9E9
| 580273 ||  || — || September 30, 2013 || Mount Lemmon || Mount Lemmon Survey ||  || align=right | 1.4 km || 
|-id=274 bgcolor=#fefefe
| 580274 ||  || — || May 28, 2009 || Mount Lemmon || Mount Lemmon Survey ||  || align=right data-sort-value="0.65" | 650 m || 
|-id=275 bgcolor=#E9E9E9
| 580275 ||  || — || January 17, 2015 || Haleakala || Pan-STARRS ||  || align=right | 1.1 km || 
|-id=276 bgcolor=#E9E9E9
| 580276 ||  || — || January 17, 2015 || Haleakala || Pan-STARRS ||  || align=right | 1.5 km || 
|-id=277 bgcolor=#E9E9E9
| 580277 ||  || — || January 17, 2015 || Haleakala || Pan-STARRS ||  || align=right | 1.5 km || 
|-id=278 bgcolor=#E9E9E9
| 580278 ||  || — || November 12, 2001 || Apache Point || SDSS Collaboration ||  || align=right | 1.3 km || 
|-id=279 bgcolor=#E9E9E9
| 580279 ||  || — || July 28, 2005 || Palomar || NEAT ||  || align=right data-sort-value="0.80" | 800 m || 
|-id=280 bgcolor=#E9E9E9
| 580280 ||  || — || December 9, 2010 || Mount Lemmon || Mount Lemmon Survey || EUN || align=right | 1.1 km || 
|-id=281 bgcolor=#E9E9E9
| 580281 ||  || — || December 13, 2006 || Mount Lemmon || Mount Lemmon Survey ||  || align=right data-sort-value="0.89" | 890 m || 
|-id=282 bgcolor=#fefefe
| 580282 ||  || — || March 11, 2005 || Mount Lemmon || Mount Lemmon Survey ||  || align=right data-sort-value="0.63" | 630 m || 
|-id=283 bgcolor=#E9E9E9
| 580283 ||  || — || September 12, 2009 || ESA OGS || ESA OGS ||  || align=right | 1.5 km || 
|-id=284 bgcolor=#fefefe
| 580284 ||  || — || December 26, 2014 || Haleakala || Pan-STARRS ||  || align=right data-sort-value="0.81" | 810 m || 
|-id=285 bgcolor=#E9E9E9
| 580285 ||  || — || October 5, 2013 || Mount Lemmon || Mount Lemmon Survey ||  || align=right | 1.7 km || 
|-id=286 bgcolor=#E9E9E9
| 580286 ||  || — || January 4, 2011 || Mount Lemmon || Mount Lemmon Survey ||  || align=right data-sort-value="0.86" | 860 m || 
|-id=287 bgcolor=#E9E9E9
| 580287 ||  || — || September 13, 2013 || Mount Lemmon || Mount Lemmon Survey ||  || align=right | 1.1 km || 
|-id=288 bgcolor=#E9E9E9
| 580288 ||  || — || August 23, 2004 || Kitt Peak || Spacewatch ||  || align=right | 1.9 km || 
|-id=289 bgcolor=#E9E9E9
| 580289 ||  || — || April 18, 2012 || Mount Lemmon || Mount Lemmon Survey ||  || align=right data-sort-value="0.82" | 820 m || 
|-id=290 bgcolor=#E9E9E9
| 580290 ||  || — || February 6, 2006 || Mount Lemmon || Mount Lemmon Survey ||  || align=right | 1.8 km || 
|-id=291 bgcolor=#fefefe
| 580291 ||  || — || February 27, 2012 || Haleakala || Pan-STARRS ||  || align=right data-sort-value="0.57" | 570 m || 
|-id=292 bgcolor=#fefefe
| 580292 ||  || — || January 18, 2015 || Mount Lemmon || Mount Lemmon Survey ||  || align=right data-sort-value="0.72" | 720 m || 
|-id=293 bgcolor=#E9E9E9
| 580293 ||  || — || May 8, 2008 || Mount Lemmon || Mount Lemmon Survey ||  || align=right | 1.0 km || 
|-id=294 bgcolor=#E9E9E9
| 580294 ||  || — || December 10, 2009 || Mount Lemmon || Mount Lemmon Survey ||  || align=right | 1.7 km || 
|-id=295 bgcolor=#E9E9E9
| 580295 ||  || — || September 2, 2005 || Palomar || NEAT ||  || align=right | 1.2 km || 
|-id=296 bgcolor=#E9E9E9
| 580296 ||  || — || January 18, 2015 || Mount Lemmon || Mount Lemmon Survey ||  || align=right | 1.6 km || 
|-id=297 bgcolor=#d6d6d6
| 580297 ||  || — || November 21, 2008 || Kitt Peak || Spacewatch || EOS || align=right | 1.4 km || 
|-id=298 bgcolor=#E9E9E9
| 580298 ||  || — || August 23, 2004 || Kitt Peak || Spacewatch ||  || align=right | 1.5 km || 
|-id=299 bgcolor=#E9E9E9
| 580299 ||  || — || July 28, 2009 || Kitt Peak || Spacewatch ||  || align=right data-sort-value="0.87" | 870 m || 
|-id=300 bgcolor=#E9E9E9
| 580300 ||  || — || March 26, 2007 || Kitt Peak || Spacewatch ||  || align=right | 1.2 km || 
|}

580301–580400 

|-bgcolor=#E9E9E9
| 580301 Aznarmacías ||  ||  || September 23, 2014 || La Palma || O. Vaduvescu, M. Hollands ||  || align=right | 1.4 km || 
|-id=302 bgcolor=#fefefe
| 580302 ||  || — || January 18, 2015 || Mount Lemmon || Mount Lemmon Survey ||  || align=right data-sort-value="0.64" | 640 m || 
|-id=303 bgcolor=#E9E9E9
| 580303 ||  || — || September 19, 2009 || Kitt Peak || Spacewatch ||  || align=right | 1.7 km || 
|-id=304 bgcolor=#E9E9E9
| 580304 ||  || — || February 11, 2011 || Mount Lemmon || Mount Lemmon Survey ||  || align=right | 1.1 km || 
|-id=305 bgcolor=#d6d6d6
| 580305 ||  || — || January 18, 2015 || Haleakala || Pan-STARRS ||  || align=right | 1.8 km || 
|-id=306 bgcolor=#fefefe
| 580306 ||  || — || January 6, 2010 || Kitt Peak || Spacewatch || H || align=right data-sort-value="0.46" | 460 m || 
|-id=307 bgcolor=#E9E9E9
| 580307 ||  || — || August 23, 2003 || Palomar || NEAT ||  || align=right | 2.3 km || 
|-id=308 bgcolor=#E9E9E9
| 580308 ||  || — || September 18, 2009 || Catalina || CSS || ADE || align=right | 1.8 km || 
|-id=309 bgcolor=#E9E9E9
| 580309 ||  || — || February 12, 2002 || Kitt Peak || Spacewatch ||  || align=right | 1.2 km || 
|-id=310 bgcolor=#E9E9E9
| 580310 ||  || — || September 1, 2005 || Kitt Peak || Spacewatch || (5) || align=right data-sort-value="0.69" | 690 m || 
|-id=311 bgcolor=#E9E9E9
| 580311 ||  || — || November 26, 2014 || Haleakala || Pan-STARRS ||  || align=right data-sort-value="0.93" | 930 m || 
|-id=312 bgcolor=#E9E9E9
| 580312 ||  || — || November 17, 2009 || Mount Lemmon || Mount Lemmon Survey ||  || align=right | 1.2 km || 
|-id=313 bgcolor=#E9E9E9
| 580313 ||  || — || May 30, 2012 || Mount Lemmon || Mount Lemmon Survey ||  || align=right | 1.5 km || 
|-id=314 bgcolor=#d6d6d6
| 580314 ||  || — || October 20, 2007 || Mount Lemmon || Mount Lemmon Survey ||  || align=right | 2.7 km || 
|-id=315 bgcolor=#E9E9E9
| 580315 ||  || — || January 28, 2011 || Kitt Peak || Spacewatch ||  || align=right data-sort-value="0.68" | 680 m || 
|-id=316 bgcolor=#E9E9E9
| 580316 ||  || — || December 10, 2009 || Mount Lemmon || Mount Lemmon Survey ||  || align=right | 2.1 km || 
|-id=317 bgcolor=#fefefe
| 580317 ||  || — || April 27, 2012 || Haleakala || Pan-STARRS ||  || align=right data-sort-value="0.65" | 650 m || 
|-id=318 bgcolor=#E9E9E9
| 580318 ||  || — || December 18, 2014 || Haleakala || Pan-STARRS ||  || align=right | 1.5 km || 
|-id=319 bgcolor=#E9E9E9
| 580319 ||  || — || November 25, 2009 || Kitt Peak || Spacewatch ||  || align=right | 2.9 km || 
|-id=320 bgcolor=#d6d6d6
| 580320 ||  || — || August 13, 2012 || Haleakala || Pan-STARRS ||  || align=right | 2.8 km || 
|-id=321 bgcolor=#E9E9E9
| 580321 ||  || — || March 1, 2011 || Mount Lemmon || Mount Lemmon Survey ||  || align=right | 1.2 km || 
|-id=322 bgcolor=#d6d6d6
| 580322 ||  || — || November 3, 2014 || Mount Lemmon || Mount Lemmon Survey ||  || align=right | 2.9 km || 
|-id=323 bgcolor=#E9E9E9
| 580323 ||  || — || April 30, 2011 || Mount Lemmon || Mount Lemmon Survey ||  || align=right | 1.7 km || 
|-id=324 bgcolor=#E9E9E9
| 580324 ||  || — || October 30, 2006 || Mount Lemmon || Mount Lemmon Survey ||  || align=right | 1.2 km || 
|-id=325 bgcolor=#d6d6d6
| 580325 ||  || — || July 2, 2013 || Haleakala || Pan-STARRS ||  || align=right | 2.9 km || 
|-id=326 bgcolor=#E9E9E9
| 580326 ||  || — || November 30, 2014 || Haleakala || Pan-STARRS ||  || align=right | 2.0 km || 
|-id=327 bgcolor=#E9E9E9
| 580327 ||  || — || December 21, 2014 || Mount Lemmon || Mount Lemmon Survey ||  || align=right | 2.3 km || 
|-id=328 bgcolor=#E9E9E9
| 580328 ||  || — || January 14, 2011 || Mount Lemmon || Mount Lemmon Survey ||  || align=right | 1.1 km || 
|-id=329 bgcolor=#fefefe
| 580329 ||  || — || January 18, 2008 || Mount Lemmon || Mount Lemmon Survey ||  || align=right data-sort-value="0.83" | 830 m || 
|-id=330 bgcolor=#E9E9E9
| 580330 ||  || — || October 25, 2001 || Apache Point || SDSS Collaboration ||  || align=right data-sort-value="0.65" | 650 m || 
|-id=331 bgcolor=#E9E9E9
| 580331 ||  || — || January 19, 2015 || Mount Lemmon || Mount Lemmon Survey ||  || align=right data-sort-value="0.89" | 890 m || 
|-id=332 bgcolor=#d6d6d6
| 580332 ||  || — || July 11, 2007 || Lulin || LUSS || 615 || align=right | 1.6 km || 
|-id=333 bgcolor=#E9E9E9
| 580333 ||  || — || February 21, 2007 || Mount Lemmon || Mount Lemmon Survey ||  || align=right data-sort-value="0.86" | 860 m || 
|-id=334 bgcolor=#E9E9E9
| 580334 ||  || — || October 3, 2013 || Kitt Peak || Spacewatch ||  || align=right | 1.5 km || 
|-id=335 bgcolor=#E9E9E9
| 580335 ||  || — || January 19, 2015 || Haleakala || Pan-STARRS ||  || align=right | 1.1 km || 
|-id=336 bgcolor=#E9E9E9
| 580336 ||  || — || October 28, 2014 || Haleakala || Pan-STARRS ||  || align=right | 1.1 km || 
|-id=337 bgcolor=#E9E9E9
| 580337 ||  || — || March 5, 2011 || Kitt Peak || Spacewatch ||  || align=right | 1.5 km || 
|-id=338 bgcolor=#E9E9E9
| 580338 ||  || — || October 7, 2005 || Kitt Peak || Spacewatch ||  || align=right data-sort-value="0.86" | 860 m || 
|-id=339 bgcolor=#E9E9E9
| 580339 ||  || — || January 19, 2015 || Haleakala || Pan-STARRS ||  || align=right | 1.6 km || 
|-id=340 bgcolor=#fefefe
| 580340 ||  || — || January 19, 2015 || Haleakala || Pan-STARRS ||  || align=right data-sort-value="0.71" | 710 m || 
|-id=341 bgcolor=#E9E9E9
| 580341 ||  || — || November 24, 2009 || Kitt Peak || Spacewatch ||  || align=right | 1.7 km || 
|-id=342 bgcolor=#E9E9E9
| 580342 ||  || — || September 3, 2013 || Calar Alto || F. Hormuth || MAR || align=right | 1.0 km || 
|-id=343 bgcolor=#E9E9E9
| 580343 ||  || — || April 18, 2007 || Mount Lemmon || Mount Lemmon Survey ||  || align=right | 1.6 km || 
|-id=344 bgcolor=#E9E9E9
| 580344 ||  || — || December 2, 2014 || Haleakala || Pan-STARRS ||  || align=right | 2.0 km || 
|-id=345 bgcolor=#E9E9E9
| 580345 ||  || — || February 16, 2002 || Palomar || NEAT ||  || align=right | 2.3 km || 
|-id=346 bgcolor=#E9E9E9
| 580346 ||  || — || March 26, 2011 || Kitt Peak || Spacewatch ||  || align=right | 1.9 km || 
|-id=347 bgcolor=#E9E9E9
| 580347 ||  || — || September 1, 2005 || Palomar || NEAT ||  || align=right | 1.3 km || 
|-id=348 bgcolor=#E9E9E9
| 580348 ||  || — || April 27, 2011 || Kitt Peak || Spacewatch ||  || align=right | 2.3 km || 
|-id=349 bgcolor=#E9E9E9
| 580349 ||  || — || April 24, 2007 || Mount Lemmon || Mount Lemmon Survey ||  || align=right | 1.2 km || 
|-id=350 bgcolor=#fefefe
| 580350 ||  || — || January 19, 2015 || Haleakala || Pan-STARRS || H || align=right data-sort-value="0.53" | 530 m || 
|-id=351 bgcolor=#E9E9E9
| 580351 ||  || — || November 29, 2005 || Kitt Peak || Spacewatch ||  || align=right | 1.1 km || 
|-id=352 bgcolor=#FA8072
| 580352 ||  || — || January 19, 2015 || Haleakala || Pan-STARRS || H || align=right data-sort-value="0.57" | 570 m || 
|-id=353 bgcolor=#E9E9E9
| 580353 ||  || — || November 19, 2009 || Mount Lemmon || Mount Lemmon Survey ||  || align=right | 1.1 km || 
|-id=354 bgcolor=#d6d6d6
| 580354 ||  || — || December 29, 2014 || Haleakala || Pan-STARRS ||  || align=right | 2.7 km || 
|-id=355 bgcolor=#fefefe
| 580355 ||  || — || February 4, 2003 || Haleakala || AMOS ||  || align=right data-sort-value="0.81" | 810 m || 
|-id=356 bgcolor=#E9E9E9
| 580356 ||  || — || December 20, 2009 || Mount Lemmon || Mount Lemmon Survey ||  || align=right | 2.8 km || 
|-id=357 bgcolor=#fefefe
| 580357 ||  || — || January 19, 2015 || Haleakala || Pan-STARRS ||  || align=right data-sort-value="0.58" | 580 m || 
|-id=358 bgcolor=#E9E9E9
| 580358 ||  || — || February 16, 2002 || Palomar || NEAT || EUN || align=right | 1.3 km || 
|-id=359 bgcolor=#d6d6d6
| 580359 ||  || — || February 14, 2005 || Kitt Peak || Spacewatch ||  || align=right | 3.1 km || 
|-id=360 bgcolor=#E9E9E9
| 580360 ||  || — || September 21, 2003 || Kitt Peak || Spacewatch ||  || align=right | 2.6 km || 
|-id=361 bgcolor=#fefefe
| 580361 ||  || — || November 14, 2006 || Kitt Peak || Spacewatch ||  || align=right data-sort-value="0.80" | 800 m || 
|-id=362 bgcolor=#fefefe
| 580362 ||  || — || January 16, 2015 || Mount Lemmon || Mount Lemmon Survey ||  || align=right data-sort-value="0.65" | 650 m || 
|-id=363 bgcolor=#fefefe
| 580363 ||  || — || December 30, 2007 || Mount Lemmon || Mount Lemmon Survey ||  || align=right data-sort-value="0.49" | 490 m || 
|-id=364 bgcolor=#E9E9E9
| 580364 ||  || — || October 3, 2013 || Haleakala || Pan-STARRS || HOF || align=right | 1.9 km || 
|-id=365 bgcolor=#E9E9E9
| 580365 ||  || — || January 17, 2015 || Haleakala || Pan-STARRS ||  || align=right | 1.1 km || 
|-id=366 bgcolor=#fefefe
| 580366 ||  || — || October 3, 2013 || Haleakala || Pan-STARRS ||  || align=right data-sort-value="0.78" | 780 m || 
|-id=367 bgcolor=#fefefe
| 580367 ||  || — || August 25, 2008 || Marly || P. Kocher || H || align=right data-sort-value="0.68" | 680 m || 
|-id=368 bgcolor=#E9E9E9
| 580368 ||  || — || September 24, 2013 || Mount Lemmon || Mount Lemmon Survey ||  || align=right | 1.3 km || 
|-id=369 bgcolor=#E9E9E9
| 580369 ||  || — || January 17, 2015 || Haleakala || Pan-STARRS ||  || align=right | 1.1 km || 
|-id=370 bgcolor=#d6d6d6
| 580370 ||  || — || October 13, 2013 || Kitt Peak || Spacewatch ||  || align=right | 1.9 km || 
|-id=371 bgcolor=#fefefe
| 580371 ||  || — || January 17, 2015 || Haleakala || Pan-STARRS ||  || align=right data-sort-value="0.68" | 680 m || 
|-id=372 bgcolor=#E9E9E9
| 580372 ||  || — || July 16, 2004 || Cerro Tololo || Cerro Tololo Obs. ||  || align=right | 1.3 km || 
|-id=373 bgcolor=#E9E9E9
| 580373 ||  || — || June 16, 2012 || Haleakala || Pan-STARRS ||  || align=right | 2.0 km || 
|-id=374 bgcolor=#E9E9E9
| 580374 ||  || — || March 23, 2007 || Mauna Kea || Mauna Kea Obs. || EUN || align=right data-sort-value="0.92" | 920 m || 
|-id=375 bgcolor=#E9E9E9
| 580375 ||  || — || January 26, 2011 || Kitt Peak || Spacewatch ||  || align=right data-sort-value="0.75" | 750 m || 
|-id=376 bgcolor=#fefefe
| 580376 ||  || — || March 29, 2012 || Haleakala || Pan-STARRS ||  || align=right data-sort-value="0.65" | 650 m || 
|-id=377 bgcolor=#E9E9E9
| 580377 ||  || — || November 26, 2014 || Haleakala || Pan-STARRS ||  || align=right | 1.6 km || 
|-id=378 bgcolor=#E9E9E9
| 580378 ||  || — || January 17, 2015 || Haleakala || Pan-STARRS ||  || align=right data-sort-value="0.72" | 720 m || 
|-id=379 bgcolor=#E9E9E9
| 580379 ||  || — || October 24, 2013 || Mount Lemmon || Mount Lemmon Survey ||  || align=right | 1.7 km || 
|-id=380 bgcolor=#E9E9E9
| 580380 ||  || — || August 15, 2004 || Cerro Tololo || Cerro Tololo Obs. ||  || align=right | 1.4 km || 
|-id=381 bgcolor=#E9E9E9
| 580381 ||  || — || November 2, 2013 || Mount Lemmon || Mount Lemmon Survey ||  || align=right | 1.1 km || 
|-id=382 bgcolor=#E9E9E9
| 580382 ||  || — || October 24, 2013 || Mount Lemmon || Mount Lemmon Survey ||  || align=right | 1.1 km || 
|-id=383 bgcolor=#E9E9E9
| 580383 ||  || — || September 19, 2009 || Mount Lemmon || Mount Lemmon Survey ||  || align=right | 2.0 km || 
|-id=384 bgcolor=#E9E9E9
| 580384 ||  || — || March 9, 2007 || Kitt Peak || Spacewatch ||  || align=right | 1.2 km || 
|-id=385 bgcolor=#E9E9E9
| 580385 ||  || — || December 26, 2014 || Haleakala || Pan-STARRS ||  || align=right | 1.6 km || 
|-id=386 bgcolor=#E9E9E9
| 580386 ||  || — || January 13, 2011 || Kitt Peak || Spacewatch ||  || align=right data-sort-value="0.97" | 970 m || 
|-id=387 bgcolor=#E9E9E9
| 580387 ||  || — || May 10, 2007 || Mount Lemmon || Mount Lemmon Survey || ADE || align=right | 1.6 km || 
|-id=388 bgcolor=#E9E9E9
| 580388 ||  || — || June 22, 2012 || Bergisch Gladbach || W. Bickel ||  || align=right | 1.8 km || 
|-id=389 bgcolor=#E9E9E9
| 580389 ||  || — || January 20, 2015 || Kitt Peak || Spacewatch ||  || align=right data-sort-value="0.95" | 950 m || 
|-id=390 bgcolor=#E9E9E9
| 580390 ||  || — || January 28, 2011 || Mount Lemmon || Mount Lemmon Survey ||  || align=right | 1.6 km || 
|-id=391 bgcolor=#E9E9E9
| 580391 ||  || — || November 18, 2009 || Kitt Peak || Spacewatch ||  || align=right | 1.5 km || 
|-id=392 bgcolor=#E9E9E9
| 580392 ||  || — || January 8, 2011 || Mount Lemmon || Mount Lemmon Survey ||  || align=right data-sort-value="0.82" | 820 m || 
|-id=393 bgcolor=#fefefe
| 580393 ||  || — || November 21, 2014 || Haleakala || Pan-STARRS ||  || align=right data-sort-value="0.85" | 850 m || 
|-id=394 bgcolor=#E9E9E9
| 580394 ||  || — || February 26, 2007 || Mount Lemmon || Mount Lemmon Survey ||  || align=right | 1.3 km || 
|-id=395 bgcolor=#E9E9E9
| 580395 ||  || — || September 6, 2008 || Mount Lemmon || Mount Lemmon Survey ||  || align=right | 1.4 km || 
|-id=396 bgcolor=#fefefe
| 580396 ||  || — || March 29, 2012 || Haleakala || Pan-STARRS ||  || align=right data-sort-value="0.53" | 530 m || 
|-id=397 bgcolor=#E9E9E9
| 580397 ||  || — || December 5, 2005 || Mount Lemmon || Mount Lemmon Survey ||  || align=right | 1.1 km || 
|-id=398 bgcolor=#E9E9E9
| 580398 ||  || — || May 20, 2012 || Mount Lemmon || Mount Lemmon Survey ||  || align=right | 1.3 km || 
|-id=399 bgcolor=#E9E9E9
| 580399 ||  || — || April 29, 2008 || Mount Lemmon || Mount Lemmon Survey ||  || align=right data-sort-value="0.75" | 750 m || 
|-id=400 bgcolor=#E9E9E9
| 580400 ||  || — || May 12, 2012 || Haleakala || Pan-STARRS ||  || align=right | 1.2 km || 
|}

580401–580500 

|-bgcolor=#E9E9E9
| 580401 ||  || — || October 22, 2009 || Mount Lemmon || Mount Lemmon Survey ||  || align=right | 1.2 km || 
|-id=402 bgcolor=#E9E9E9
| 580402 ||  || — || October 26, 2013 || Mount Lemmon || Mount Lemmon Survey ||  || align=right | 1.9 km || 
|-id=403 bgcolor=#E9E9E9
| 580403 ||  || — || January 20, 2015 || Haleakala || Pan-STARRS ||  || align=right | 1.3 km || 
|-id=404 bgcolor=#fefefe
| 580404 ||  || — || March 31, 2008 || Mount Lemmon || Mount Lemmon Survey ||  || align=right data-sort-value="0.59" | 590 m || 
|-id=405 bgcolor=#E9E9E9
| 580405 ||  || — || September 24, 2004 || Kitt Peak || Spacewatch ||  || align=right | 1.2 km || 
|-id=406 bgcolor=#E9E9E9
| 580406 ||  || — || September 25, 2008 || Mount Lemmon || Mount Lemmon Survey ||  || align=right | 1.3 km || 
|-id=407 bgcolor=#E9E9E9
| 580407 ||  || — || January 20, 2015 || Haleakala || Pan-STARRS ||  || align=right | 1.2 km || 
|-id=408 bgcolor=#E9E9E9
| 580408 ||  || — || January 20, 2015 || Haleakala || Pan-STARRS ||  || align=right | 2.4 km || 
|-id=409 bgcolor=#E9E9E9
| 580409 ||  || — || January 20, 2015 || Haleakala || Pan-STARRS ||  || align=right | 1.2 km || 
|-id=410 bgcolor=#fefefe
| 580410 ||  || — || October 22, 2003 || Kitt Peak || Kitt Peak Obs. ||  || align=right data-sort-value="0.54" | 540 m || 
|-id=411 bgcolor=#E9E9E9
| 580411 ||  || — || September 23, 2008 || Kitt Peak || Spacewatch ||  || align=right | 2.1 km || 
|-id=412 bgcolor=#E9E9E9
| 580412 ||  || — || August 22, 2004 || Kitt Peak || Spacewatch ||  || align=right | 1.4 km || 
|-id=413 bgcolor=#E9E9E9
| 580413 ||  || — || March 5, 2002 || Apache Point || SDSS Collaboration ||  || align=right | 1.4 km || 
|-id=414 bgcolor=#E9E9E9
| 580414 ||  || — || July 6, 2003 || Kitt Peak || Spacewatch ||  || align=right | 2.8 km || 
|-id=415 bgcolor=#E9E9E9
| 580415 ||  || — || April 27, 2012 || Mount Lemmon || Mount Lemmon Survey ||  || align=right | 1.1 km || 
|-id=416 bgcolor=#d6d6d6
| 580416 ||  || — || October 21, 2008 || Kitt Peak || Spacewatch ||  || align=right | 2.2 km || 
|-id=417 bgcolor=#E9E9E9
| 580417 ||  || — || January 20, 2015 || Haleakala || Pan-STARRS ||  || align=right | 1.2 km || 
|-id=418 bgcolor=#E9E9E9
| 580418 ||  || — || January 7, 2006 || Kitt Peak || Spacewatch || EUN || align=right data-sort-value="0.85" | 850 m || 
|-id=419 bgcolor=#E9E9E9
| 580419 ||  || — || February 8, 2011 || Kitt Peak || Spacewatch ||  || align=right | 1.4 km || 
|-id=420 bgcolor=#E9E9E9
| 580420 ||  || — || January 20, 2015 || Haleakala || Pan-STARRS ||  || align=right data-sort-value="0.76" | 760 m || 
|-id=421 bgcolor=#E9E9E9
| 580421 ||  || — || October 1, 2013 || Calar Alto-CASADO || S. Mottola, G. Proffe ||  || align=right | 1.8 km || 
|-id=422 bgcolor=#fefefe
| 580422 ||  || — || July 29, 2008 || Mount Lemmon || Mount Lemmon Survey || H || align=right data-sort-value="0.41" | 410 m || 
|-id=423 bgcolor=#E9E9E9
| 580423 ||  || — || January 20, 2015 || Haleakala || Pan-STARRS ||  || align=right data-sort-value="0.98" | 980 m || 
|-id=424 bgcolor=#E9E9E9
| 580424 ||  || — || November 17, 2009 || Mount Lemmon || Mount Lemmon Survey ||  || align=right data-sort-value="0.93" | 930 m || 
|-id=425 bgcolor=#E9E9E9
| 580425 ||  || — || December 29, 2013 || Haleakala || Pan-STARRS ||  || align=right | 1.5 km || 
|-id=426 bgcolor=#E9E9E9
| 580426 ||  || — || December 1, 2005 || Kitt Peak || L. H. Wasserman, R. Millis ||  || align=right | 2.3 km || 
|-id=427 bgcolor=#fefefe
| 580427 ||  || — || November 12, 2010 || Mount Lemmon || Mount Lemmon Survey ||  || align=right data-sort-value="0.59" | 590 m || 
|-id=428 bgcolor=#E9E9E9
| 580428 ||  || — || January 31, 2006 || Kitt Peak || Spacewatch ||  || align=right | 1.6 km || 
|-id=429 bgcolor=#d6d6d6
| 580429 ||  || — || January 20, 2015 || Haleakala || Pan-STARRS ||  || align=right | 1.9 km || 
|-id=430 bgcolor=#E9E9E9
| 580430 ||  || — || November 11, 2013 || Kitt Peak || Spacewatch ||  || align=right | 1.3 km || 
|-id=431 bgcolor=#E9E9E9
| 580431 ||  || — || April 2, 2011 || Kitt Peak || Spacewatch ||  || align=right | 1.9 km || 
|-id=432 bgcolor=#d6d6d6
| 580432 ||  || — || September 15, 2007 || Kitt Peak || Spacewatch ||  || align=right | 2.5 km || 
|-id=433 bgcolor=#fefefe
| 580433 ||  || — || January 2, 2011 || Mount Lemmon || Mount Lemmon Survey ||  || align=right data-sort-value="0.53" | 530 m || 
|-id=434 bgcolor=#E9E9E9
| 580434 ||  || — || January 20, 2015 || Haleakala || Pan-STARRS ||  || align=right data-sort-value="0.86" | 860 m || 
|-id=435 bgcolor=#E9E9E9
| 580435 ||  || — || February 6, 2002 || Kitt Peak || R. Millis, M. W. Buie ||  || align=right | 1.2 km || 
|-id=436 bgcolor=#E9E9E9
| 580436 ||  || — || January 20, 2015 || Haleakala || Pan-STARRS ||  || align=right data-sort-value="0.97" | 970 m || 
|-id=437 bgcolor=#E9E9E9
| 580437 ||  || — || October 31, 2005 || Mauna Kea || Mauna Kea Obs. ||  || align=right | 2.1 km || 
|-id=438 bgcolor=#E9E9E9
| 580438 ||  || — || April 14, 2011 || Mount Lemmon || Mount Lemmon Survey ||  || align=right | 2.3 km || 
|-id=439 bgcolor=#E9E9E9
| 580439 ||  || — || October 13, 2004 || Moletai || K. Černis, J. Zdanavičius ||  || align=right | 1.7 km || 
|-id=440 bgcolor=#E9E9E9
| 580440 ||  || — || October 16, 2001 || Palomar || NEAT ||  || align=right data-sort-value="0.80" | 800 m || 
|-id=441 bgcolor=#E9E9E9
| 580441 ||  || — || January 20, 2015 || Haleakala || Pan-STARRS ||  || align=right | 1.3 km || 
|-id=442 bgcolor=#E9E9E9
| 580442 ||  || — || April 3, 2011 || Haleakala || Pan-STARRS ||  || align=right | 1.2 km || 
|-id=443 bgcolor=#E9E9E9
| 580443 ||  || — || November 1, 2013 || Mount Lemmon || Mount Lemmon Survey ||  || align=right | 1.2 km || 
|-id=444 bgcolor=#E9E9E9
| 580444 ||  || — || January 23, 2006 || Kitt Peak || Spacewatch ||  || align=right | 2.9 km || 
|-id=445 bgcolor=#E9E9E9
| 580445 ||  || — || January 20, 2015 || Haleakala || Pan-STARRS ||  || align=right | 1.8 km || 
|-id=446 bgcolor=#E9E9E9
| 580446 ||  || — || January 20, 2015 || Haleakala || Pan-STARRS ||  || align=right | 1.8 km || 
|-id=447 bgcolor=#d6d6d6
| 580447 ||  || — || September 12, 2007 || Mount Lemmon || Mount Lemmon Survey ||  || align=right | 2.2 km || 
|-id=448 bgcolor=#d6d6d6
| 580448 ||  || — || February 11, 2004 || Kitt Peak || Spacewatch ||  || align=right | 2.7 km || 
|-id=449 bgcolor=#E9E9E9
| 580449 ||  || — || August 26, 2012 || Haleakala || Pan-STARRS ||  || align=right | 2.0 km || 
|-id=450 bgcolor=#E9E9E9
| 580450 ||  || — || May 12, 2007 || Mount Lemmon || Mount Lemmon Survey ||  || align=right | 1.2 km || 
|-id=451 bgcolor=#fefefe
| 580451 ||  || — || April 26, 2008 || Kitt Peak || Spacewatch ||  || align=right data-sort-value="0.68" | 680 m || 
|-id=452 bgcolor=#E9E9E9
| 580452 ||  || — || September 27, 2009 || Mount Lemmon || Mount Lemmon Survey ||  || align=right data-sort-value="0.82" | 820 m || 
|-id=453 bgcolor=#E9E9E9
| 580453 ||  || — || December 29, 2005 || Kitt Peak || Spacewatch ||  || align=right | 1.2 km || 
|-id=454 bgcolor=#E9E9E9
| 580454 ||  || — || October 31, 2005 || Mauna Kea || Mauna Kea Obs. ||  || align=right | 2.2 km || 
|-id=455 bgcolor=#E9E9E9
| 580455 ||  || — || August 17, 2009 || Catalina || CSS ||  || align=right data-sort-value="0.89" | 890 m || 
|-id=456 bgcolor=#E9E9E9
| 580456 ||  || — || January 23, 2006 || Kitt Peak || Spacewatch ||  || align=right | 1.9 km || 
|-id=457 bgcolor=#E9E9E9
| 580457 ||  || — || December 1, 2014 || Haleakala || Pan-STARRS ||  || align=right | 2.0 km || 
|-id=458 bgcolor=#fefefe
| 580458 ||  || — || December 16, 2011 || XuYi || PMO NEO || H || align=right data-sort-value="0.65" | 650 m || 
|-id=459 bgcolor=#fefefe
| 580459 ||  || — || June 19, 2012 || ESA OGS || ESA OGS ||  || align=right | 1.1 km || 
|-id=460 bgcolor=#E9E9E9
| 580460 ||  || — || November 16, 2009 || Mount Lemmon || Mount Lemmon Survey ||  || align=right | 2.3 km || 
|-id=461 bgcolor=#E9E9E9
| 580461 ||  || — || October 5, 2013 || Haleakala || Pan-STARRS ||  || align=right | 1.1 km || 
|-id=462 bgcolor=#E9E9E9
| 580462 ||  || — || December 25, 2005 || Mount Lemmon || Mount Lemmon Survey ||  || align=right data-sort-value="0.97" | 970 m || 
|-id=463 bgcolor=#E9E9E9
| 580463 ||  || — || January 20, 2015 || Haleakala || Pan-STARRS ||  || align=right | 1.6 km || 
|-id=464 bgcolor=#E9E9E9
| 580464 ||  || — || September 4, 2008 || Kitt Peak || Spacewatch ||  || align=right | 1.8 km || 
|-id=465 bgcolor=#E9E9E9
| 580465 ||  || — || October 1, 2013 || Kitt Peak || Spacewatch ||  || align=right | 1.7 km || 
|-id=466 bgcolor=#E9E9E9
| 580466 ||  || — || January 20, 2015 || Haleakala || Pan-STARRS ||  || align=right data-sort-value="0.81" | 810 m || 
|-id=467 bgcolor=#fefefe
| 580467 ||  || — || February 27, 2012 || Haleakala || Pan-STARRS ||  || align=right data-sort-value="0.75" | 750 m || 
|-id=468 bgcolor=#fefefe
| 580468 ||  || — || March 7, 2008 || Mount Lemmon || Mount Lemmon Survey ||  || align=right data-sort-value="0.65" | 650 m || 
|-id=469 bgcolor=#E9E9E9
| 580469 ||  || — || January 23, 2006 || Mount Lemmon || Mount Lemmon Survey ||  || align=right | 1.5 km || 
|-id=470 bgcolor=#E9E9E9
| 580470 ||  || — || January 29, 2011 || Kitt Peak || Spacewatch ||  || align=right | 1.2 km || 
|-id=471 bgcolor=#fefefe
| 580471 ||  || — || October 4, 2006 || Mount Lemmon || Mount Lemmon Survey ||  || align=right data-sort-value="0.65" | 650 m || 
|-id=472 bgcolor=#E9E9E9
| 580472 ||  || — || March 14, 2007 || Mount Lemmon || Mount Lemmon Survey ||  || align=right | 1.3 km || 
|-id=473 bgcolor=#E9E9E9
| 580473 ||  || — || March 26, 2011 || Kitt Peak || Spacewatch ||  || align=right | 1.9 km || 
|-id=474 bgcolor=#E9E9E9
| 580474 ||  || — || January 20, 2015 || Haleakala || Pan-STARRS ||  || align=right | 1.1 km || 
|-id=475 bgcolor=#E9E9E9
| 580475 ||  || — || November 9, 2013 || Kitt Peak || Spacewatch ||  || align=right | 1.9 km || 
|-id=476 bgcolor=#E9E9E9
| 580476 ||  || — || January 31, 2006 || Kitt Peak || Spacewatch ||  || align=right | 1.7 km || 
|-id=477 bgcolor=#E9E9E9
| 580477 ||  || — || January 20, 2015 || Haleakala || Pan-STARRS ||  || align=right | 1.8 km || 
|-id=478 bgcolor=#E9E9E9
| 580478 ||  || — || August 9, 2004 || Anderson Mesa || LONEOS ||  || align=right | 1.5 km || 
|-id=479 bgcolor=#E9E9E9
| 580479 ||  || — || July 6, 2003 || Kitt Peak || Spacewatch ||  || align=right | 2.2 km || 
|-id=480 bgcolor=#E9E9E9
| 580480 ||  || — || January 7, 2006 || Kitt Peak || Spacewatch ||  || align=right | 1.2 km || 
|-id=481 bgcolor=#E9E9E9
| 580481 ||  || — || November 1, 2013 || Mount Lemmon || Mount Lemmon Survey ||  || align=right | 1.3 km || 
|-id=482 bgcolor=#E9E9E9
| 580482 ||  || — || September 2, 2008 || Kitt Peak || Spacewatch ||  || align=right | 2.1 km || 
|-id=483 bgcolor=#E9E9E9
| 580483 ||  || — || August 6, 2004 || Palomar || NEAT ||  || align=right | 1.0 km || 
|-id=484 bgcolor=#E9E9E9
| 580484 ||  || — || February 20, 2006 || Mount Lemmon || Mount Lemmon Survey ||  || align=right | 2.2 km || 
|-id=485 bgcolor=#E9E9E9
| 580485 ||  || — || October 3, 2013 || Haleakala || Pan-STARRS ||  || align=right data-sort-value="0.81" | 810 m || 
|-id=486 bgcolor=#E9E9E9
| 580486 ||  || — || September 30, 2003 || Kitt Peak || Spacewatch ||  || align=right | 1.9 km || 
|-id=487 bgcolor=#FA8072
| 580487 ||  || — || September 1, 2011 || Haleakala || Pan-STARRS || H || align=right data-sort-value="0.73" | 730 m || 
|-id=488 bgcolor=#E9E9E9
| 580488 ||  || — || January 23, 2015 || Haleakala || Pan-STARRS ||  || align=right | 1.8 km || 
|-id=489 bgcolor=#fefefe
| 580489 ||  || — || February 10, 2007 || Mount Lemmon || Mount Lemmon Survey || H || align=right data-sort-value="0.50" | 500 m || 
|-id=490 bgcolor=#fefefe
| 580490 ||  || — || January 3, 2012 || Mount Lemmon || Mount Lemmon Survey || H || align=right data-sort-value="0.72" | 720 m || 
|-id=491 bgcolor=#fefefe
| 580491 ||  || — || December 14, 2006 || Kitt Peak || Spacewatch || H || align=right data-sort-value="0.68" | 680 m || 
|-id=492 bgcolor=#FA8072
| 580492 ||  || — || January 19, 2015 || Haleakala || Pan-STARRS ||  || align=right data-sort-value="0.30" | 300 m || 
|-id=493 bgcolor=#fefefe
| 580493 ||  || — || September 8, 2005 || Siding Spring || SSS || H || align=right data-sort-value="0.61" | 610 m || 
|-id=494 bgcolor=#FA8072
| 580494 ||  || — || January 28, 2015 || Haleakala || Pan-STARRS || H || align=right data-sort-value="0.55" | 550 m || 
|-id=495 bgcolor=#fefefe
| 580495 ||  || — || September 8, 2000 || Kitt Peak || Spacewatch || H || align=right data-sort-value="0.57" | 570 m || 
|-id=496 bgcolor=#fefefe
| 580496 ||  || — || August 2, 2013 || Haleakala || Pan-STARRS || H || align=right data-sort-value="0.49" | 490 m || 
|-id=497 bgcolor=#fefefe
| 580497 ||  || — || January 23, 2015 || Catalina || CSS || H || align=right data-sort-value="0.71" | 710 m || 
|-id=498 bgcolor=#E9E9E9
| 580498 ||  || — || January 9, 2006 || Kitt Peak || Spacewatch ||  || align=right | 1.9 km || 
|-id=499 bgcolor=#E9E9E9
| 580499 ||  || — || January 29, 2015 || Haleakala || Pan-STARRS ||  || align=right | 1.7 km || 
|-id=500 bgcolor=#E9E9E9
| 580500 ||  || — || August 20, 2003 || Palomar || NEAT ||  || align=right | 1.9 km || 
|}

580501–580600 

|-bgcolor=#E9E9E9
| 580501 ||  || — || January 26, 2015 || Haleakala || Pan-STARRS ||  || align=right | 1.8 km || 
|-id=502 bgcolor=#E9E9E9
| 580502 ||  || — || September 28, 2008 || Mount Lemmon || Mount Lemmon Survey ||  || align=right | 1.7 km || 
|-id=503 bgcolor=#d6d6d6
| 580503 ||  || — || March 11, 2005 || Mount Lemmon || Mount Lemmon Survey ||  || align=right | 1.9 km || 
|-id=504 bgcolor=#d6d6d6
| 580504 ||  || — || April 11, 2010 || Mount Lemmon || Mount Lemmon Survey ||  || align=right | 2.3 km || 
|-id=505 bgcolor=#E9E9E9
| 580505 ||  || — || January 27, 2006 || Mount Lemmon || Mount Lemmon Survey ||  || align=right | 1.7 km || 
|-id=506 bgcolor=#E9E9E9
| 580506 ||  || — || April 5, 2011 || Mount Lemmon || Mount Lemmon Survey ||  || align=right | 1.4 km || 
|-id=507 bgcolor=#E9E9E9
| 580507 ||  || — || October 25, 2013 || Mount Lemmon || Mount Lemmon Survey ||  || align=right | 1.6 km || 
|-id=508 bgcolor=#d6d6d6
| 580508 ||  || — || January 28, 2015 || Haleakala || Pan-STARRS ||  || align=right | 2.8 km || 
|-id=509 bgcolor=#E9E9E9
| 580509 ||  || — || September 6, 2008 || Mount Lemmon || Mount Lemmon Survey ||  || align=right | 1.2 km || 
|-id=510 bgcolor=#d6d6d6
| 580510 ||  || — || January 20, 2015 || Haleakala || Pan-STARRS ||  || align=right | 2.3 km || 
|-id=511 bgcolor=#d6d6d6
| 580511 ||  || — || October 10, 2012 || Mount Lemmon || Mount Lemmon Survey ||  || align=right | 2.9 km || 
|-id=512 bgcolor=#d6d6d6
| 580512 ||  || — || January 23, 2015 || Haleakala || Pan-STARRS ||  || align=right | 2.0 km || 
|-id=513 bgcolor=#fefefe
| 580513 ||  || — || January 30, 2011 || Kitt Peak || Spacewatch ||  || align=right data-sort-value="0.90" | 900 m || 
|-id=514 bgcolor=#d6d6d6
| 580514 ||  || — || August 24, 2011 || Haleakala || Pan-STARRS ||  || align=right | 3.2 km || 
|-id=515 bgcolor=#d6d6d6
| 580515 ||  || — || January 31, 2009 || Mount Lemmon || Mount Lemmon Survey ||  || align=right | 2.6 km || 
|-id=516 bgcolor=#E9E9E9
| 580516 ||  || — || January 17, 2015 || Haleakala || Pan-STARRS ||  || align=right | 1.3 km || 
|-id=517 bgcolor=#E9E9E9
| 580517 ||  || — || November 16, 2009 || Mount Lemmon || Mount Lemmon Survey ||  || align=right data-sort-value="0.72" | 720 m || 
|-id=518 bgcolor=#E9E9E9
| 580518 ||  || — || November 25, 2005 || Mount Lemmon || Mount Lemmon Survey ||  || align=right | 1.6 km || 
|-id=519 bgcolor=#E9E9E9
| 580519 ||  || — || December 22, 2005 || Kitt Peak || Spacewatch ||  || align=right | 1.3 km || 
|-id=520 bgcolor=#E9E9E9
| 580520 ||  || — || January 17, 2015 || Mount Lemmon || Mount Lemmon Survey ||  || align=right | 1.6 km || 
|-id=521 bgcolor=#E9E9E9
| 580521 ||  || — || October 5, 2013 || Haleakala || Pan-STARRS ||  || align=right | 1.2 km || 
|-id=522 bgcolor=#E9E9E9
| 580522 ||  || — || January 17, 2015 || Mount Lemmon || Mount Lemmon Survey ||  || align=right | 1.0 km || 
|-id=523 bgcolor=#fefefe
| 580523 ||  || — || November 21, 2014 || Haleakala || Pan-STARRS ||  || align=right data-sort-value="0.88" | 880 m || 
|-id=524 bgcolor=#E9E9E9
| 580524 ||  || — || December 8, 2010 || Mount Lemmon || Mount Lemmon Survey ||  || align=right data-sort-value="0.72" | 720 m || 
|-id=525 bgcolor=#d6d6d6
| 580525 ||  || — || October 25, 2013 || Mount Lemmon || Mount Lemmon Survey ||  || align=right | 1.9 km || 
|-id=526 bgcolor=#fefefe
| 580526 ||  || — || September 30, 2003 || Kitt Peak || Spacewatch ||  || align=right data-sort-value="0.46" | 460 m || 
|-id=527 bgcolor=#E9E9E9
| 580527 ||  || — || November 29, 2014 || Haleakala || Pan-STARRS ||  || align=right | 1.1 km || 
|-id=528 bgcolor=#E9E9E9
| 580528 ||  || — || October 24, 2013 || Mount Lemmon || Mount Lemmon Survey ||  || align=right | 1.8 km || 
|-id=529 bgcolor=#E9E9E9
| 580529 ||  || — || October 3, 2013 || Haleakala || Pan-STARRS ||  || align=right | 1.6 km || 
|-id=530 bgcolor=#E9E9E9
| 580530 ||  || — || May 5, 2003 || Kitt Peak || Spacewatch ||  || align=right | 1.5 km || 
|-id=531 bgcolor=#E9E9E9
| 580531 ||  || — || January 20, 2015 || Haleakala || Pan-STARRS ||  || align=right | 1.5 km || 
|-id=532 bgcolor=#E9E9E9
| 580532 ||  || — || April 2, 2011 || Haleakala || Pan-STARRS ||  || align=right | 1.5 km || 
|-id=533 bgcolor=#E9E9E9
| 580533 ||  || — || January 21, 2015 || Haleakala || Pan-STARRS ||  || align=right data-sort-value="0.77" | 770 m || 
|-id=534 bgcolor=#d6d6d6
| 580534 ||  || — || January 19, 2015 || Haleakala || Pan-STARRS ||  || align=right | 2.6 km || 
|-id=535 bgcolor=#d6d6d6
| 580535 ||  || — || January 21, 2015 || Haleakala || Pan-STARRS ||  || align=right | 1.9 km || 
|-id=536 bgcolor=#E9E9E9
| 580536 ||  || — || January 17, 2015 || Haleakala || Pan-STARRS ||  || align=right data-sort-value="0.87" | 870 m || 
|-id=537 bgcolor=#fefefe
| 580537 ||  || — || January 23, 2015 || Haleakala || Pan-STARRS ||  || align=right data-sort-value="0.71" | 710 m || 
|-id=538 bgcolor=#E9E9E9
| 580538 ||  || — || January 20, 2015 || Mount Lemmon || Mount Lemmon Survey ||  || align=right data-sort-value="0.91" | 910 m || 
|-id=539 bgcolor=#d6d6d6
| 580539 ||  || — || January 19, 2015 || Mount Lemmon || Mount Lemmon Survey ||  || align=right | 2.7 km || 
|-id=540 bgcolor=#E9E9E9
| 580540 ||  || — || January 23, 2015 || Haleakala || Pan-STARRS ||  || align=right | 1.1 km || 
|-id=541 bgcolor=#d6d6d6
| 580541 ||  || — || January 20, 2015 || Haleakala || Pan-STARRS ||  || align=right | 2.5 km || 
|-id=542 bgcolor=#d6d6d6
| 580542 ||  || — || January 17, 2015 || Mount Lemmon || Mount Lemmon Survey ||  || align=right | 1.8 km || 
|-id=543 bgcolor=#d6d6d6
| 580543 ||  || — || January 22, 2015 || Haleakala || Pan-STARRS ||  || align=right | 2.4 km || 
|-id=544 bgcolor=#E9E9E9
| 580544 ||  || — || January 17, 2015 || Haleakala || Pan-STARRS ||  || align=right | 1.1 km || 
|-id=545 bgcolor=#E9E9E9
| 580545 ||  || — || January 22, 2015 || Haleakala || Pan-STARRS ||  || align=right data-sort-value="0.96" | 960 m || 
|-id=546 bgcolor=#E9E9E9
| 580546 ||  || — || January 16, 2015 || Haleakala || Pan-STARRS ||  || align=right | 1.2 km || 
|-id=547 bgcolor=#E9E9E9
| 580547 ||  || — || January 22, 2015 || Haleakala || Pan-STARRS ||  || align=right | 1.8 km || 
|-id=548 bgcolor=#E9E9E9
| 580548 ||  || — || October 14, 2012 || ESA OGS || ESA OGS ||  || align=right | 1.6 km || 
|-id=549 bgcolor=#E9E9E9
| 580549 ||  || — || January 19, 2015 || Mount Lemmon || Mount Lemmon Survey ||  || align=right | 1.2 km || 
|-id=550 bgcolor=#E9E9E9
| 580550 ||  || — || January 19, 2015 || Haleakala || Pan-STARRS ||  || align=right | 1.2 km || 
|-id=551 bgcolor=#E9E9E9
| 580551 ||  || — || January 22, 2015 || Haleakala || Pan-STARRS ||  || align=right | 1.1 km || 
|-id=552 bgcolor=#d6d6d6
| 580552 ||  || — || January 20, 2015 || Haleakala || Pan-STARRS ||  || align=right | 2.3 km || 
|-id=553 bgcolor=#d6d6d6
| 580553 ||  || — || January 17, 2015 || Haleakala || Pan-STARRS ||  || align=right | 2.4 km || 
|-id=554 bgcolor=#d6d6d6
| 580554 ||  || — || January 23, 2015 || Haleakala || Pan-STARRS ||  || align=right | 2.1 km || 
|-id=555 bgcolor=#fefefe
| 580555 ||  || — || January 29, 2015 || Haleakala || Pan-STARRS ||  || align=right data-sort-value="0.69" | 690 m || 
|-id=556 bgcolor=#d6d6d6
| 580556 ||  || — || January 23, 2015 || Haleakala || Pan-STARRS ||  || align=right | 2.3 km || 
|-id=557 bgcolor=#FA8072
| 580557 ||  || — || December 16, 2014 || Haleakala || Pan-STARRS || H || align=right data-sort-value="0.53" | 530 m || 
|-id=558 bgcolor=#fefefe
| 580558 ||  || — || December 14, 2007 || Mount Lemmon || Mount Lemmon Survey ||  || align=right data-sort-value="0.60" | 600 m || 
|-id=559 bgcolor=#fefefe
| 580559 ||  || — || March 30, 2008 || Kitt Peak || Spacewatch ||  || align=right data-sort-value="0.60" | 600 m || 
|-id=560 bgcolor=#fefefe
| 580560 ||  || — || February 13, 2010 || Catalina || CSS || H || align=right data-sort-value="0.65" | 650 m || 
|-id=561 bgcolor=#E9E9E9
| 580561 ||  || — || August 24, 2003 || Cerro Tololo || Cerro Tololo Obs. ||  || align=right | 1.9 km || 
|-id=562 bgcolor=#E9E9E9
| 580562 ||  || — || March 26, 2007 || Mount Lemmon || Mount Lemmon Survey ||  || align=right | 1.2 km || 
|-id=563 bgcolor=#E9E9E9
| 580563 ||  || — || September 14, 2013 || Kitt Peak || Spacewatch ||  || align=right | 1.1 km || 
|-id=564 bgcolor=#E9E9E9
| 580564 ||  || — || September 9, 2008 || Mount Lemmon || Mount Lemmon Survey ||  || align=right | 1.3 km || 
|-id=565 bgcolor=#E9E9E9
| 580565 ||  || — || January 20, 2015 || Haleakala || Pan-STARRS ||  || align=right | 1.3 km || 
|-id=566 bgcolor=#fefefe
| 580566 ||  || — || January 20, 2015 || Haleakala || Pan-STARRS || H || align=right data-sort-value="0.46" | 460 m || 
|-id=567 bgcolor=#fefefe
| 580567 ||  || — || August 23, 2003 || Palomar || NEAT || H || align=right data-sort-value="0.65" | 650 m || 
|-id=568 bgcolor=#E9E9E9
| 580568 ||  || — || March 26, 2011 || Siding Spring || SSS ||  || align=right | 2.3 km || 
|-id=569 bgcolor=#d6d6d6
| 580569 ||  || — || December 27, 2006 || Mount Lemmon || Mount Lemmon Survey || 3:2 || align=right | 3.7 km || 
|-id=570 bgcolor=#E9E9E9
| 580570 ||  || — || November 28, 2014 || Haleakala || Pan-STARRS ||  || align=right | 1.8 km || 
|-id=571 bgcolor=#E9E9E9
| 580571 ||  || — || February 5, 2011 || Catalina || CSS ||  || align=right | 1.2 km || 
|-id=572 bgcolor=#E9E9E9
| 580572 ||  || — || December 26, 2014 || Haleakala || Pan-STARRS ||  || align=right | 1.0 km || 
|-id=573 bgcolor=#E9E9E9
| 580573 ||  || — || January 9, 2006 || Kitt Peak || Spacewatch ||  || align=right | 1.2 km || 
|-id=574 bgcolor=#E9E9E9
| 580574 ||  || — || January 31, 2015 || Haleakala || Pan-STARRS ||  || align=right | 1.5 km || 
|-id=575 bgcolor=#E9E9E9
| 580575 ||  || — || December 2, 2005 || Catalina || CSS ||  || align=right | 1.8 km || 
|-id=576 bgcolor=#E9E9E9
| 580576 ||  || — || January 21, 2015 || Haleakala || Pan-STARRS ||  || align=right | 1.3 km || 
|-id=577 bgcolor=#E9E9E9
| 580577 ||  || — || January 22, 2006 || Mount Lemmon || Mount Lemmon Survey ||  || align=right | 1.3 km || 
|-id=578 bgcolor=#E9E9E9
| 580578 ||  || — || January 20, 2015 || Haleakala || Pan-STARRS ||  || align=right | 1.7 km || 
|-id=579 bgcolor=#E9E9E9
| 580579 ||  || — || November 7, 2005 || Mauna Kea || Mauna Kea Obs. ||  || align=right | 2.1 km || 
|-id=580 bgcolor=#E9E9E9
| 580580 ||  || — || April 5, 2011 || Mount Lemmon || Mount Lemmon Survey ||  || align=right | 1.6 km || 
|-id=581 bgcolor=#E9E9E9
| 580581 ||  || — || October 2, 2013 || Haleakala || Pan-STARRS ||  || align=right data-sort-value="0.74" | 740 m || 
|-id=582 bgcolor=#E9E9E9
| 580582 ||  || — || January 17, 2015 || Mount Lemmon || Mount Lemmon Survey ||  || align=right | 1.8 km || 
|-id=583 bgcolor=#E9E9E9
| 580583 ||  || — || July 22, 2004 || Mauna Kea || Mauna Kea Obs. ||  || align=right | 1.5 km || 
|-id=584 bgcolor=#E9E9E9
| 580584 ||  || — || August 27, 2005 || Palomar || NEAT ||  || align=right | 1.3 km || 
|-id=585 bgcolor=#E9E9E9
| 580585 ||  || — || October 24, 2005 || Palomar || NEAT ||  || align=right | 1.4 km || 
|-id=586 bgcolor=#E9E9E9
| 580586 ||  || — || June 3, 2008 || Mount Lemmon || Mount Lemmon Survey ||  || align=right | 1.3 km || 
|-id=587 bgcolor=#E9E9E9
| 580587 ||  || — || November 21, 2014 || Haleakala || Pan-STARRS ||  || align=right | 1.0 km || 
|-id=588 bgcolor=#FA8072
| 580588 ||  || — || November 23, 2014 || Haleakala || Pan-STARRS || H || align=right data-sort-value="0.49" | 490 m || 
|-id=589 bgcolor=#E9E9E9
| 580589 ||  || — || January 24, 2011 || Mount Lemmon || Mount Lemmon Survey ||  || align=right | 1.1 km || 
|-id=590 bgcolor=#E9E9E9
| 580590 ||  || — || January 24, 2015 || Haleakala || Pan-STARRS ||  || align=right | 1.4 km || 
|-id=591 bgcolor=#E9E9E9
| 580591 ||  || — || January 27, 2015 || Haleakala || Pan-STARRS ||  || align=right | 1.7 km || 
|-id=592 bgcolor=#E9E9E9
| 580592 ||  || — || February 25, 2011 || Kitt Peak || Spacewatch ||  || align=right | 1.1 km || 
|-id=593 bgcolor=#E9E9E9
| 580593 ||  || — || October 20, 2003 || Kitt Peak || Spacewatch ||  || align=right | 3.3 km || 
|-id=594 bgcolor=#E9E9E9
| 580594 ||  || — || November 3, 2004 || Kitt Peak || Spacewatch ||  || align=right | 2.7 km || 
|-id=595 bgcolor=#E9E9E9
| 580595 ||  || — || January 27, 2006 || Catalina || CSS ||  || align=right | 1.9 km || 
|-id=596 bgcolor=#fefefe
| 580596 ||  || — || February 28, 2012 || Haleakala || Pan-STARRS ||  || align=right data-sort-value="0.70" | 700 m || 
|-id=597 bgcolor=#E9E9E9
| 580597 ||  || — || February 5, 2011 || Catalina || CSS ||  || align=right | 1.2 km || 
|-id=598 bgcolor=#fefefe
| 580598 ||  || — || January 30, 2008 || Mount Lemmon || Mount Lemmon Survey ||  || align=right data-sort-value="0.65" | 650 m || 
|-id=599 bgcolor=#E9E9E9
| 580599 ||  || — || April 30, 2011 || Mount Lemmon || Mount Lemmon Survey ||  || align=right | 1.7 km || 
|-id=600 bgcolor=#E9E9E9
| 580600 ||  || — || March 5, 2006 || Kitt Peak || Spacewatch ||  || align=right | 1.6 km || 
|}

580601–580700 

|-bgcolor=#E9E9E9
| 580601 ||  || — || September 2, 2013 || Mount Lemmon || Mount Lemmon Survey ||  || align=right data-sort-value="0.76" | 760 m || 
|-id=602 bgcolor=#E9E9E9
| 580602 ||  || — || June 8, 2011 || Mount Lemmon || Mount Lemmon Survey ||  || align=right | 1.9 km || 
|-id=603 bgcolor=#E9E9E9
| 580603 ||  || — || September 23, 2008 || Mount Lemmon || Mount Lemmon Survey ||  || align=right | 1.6 km || 
|-id=604 bgcolor=#E9E9E9
| 580604 ||  || — || February 11, 2002 || Kitt Peak || Spacewatch ||  || align=right | 1.9 km || 
|-id=605 bgcolor=#d6d6d6
| 580605 ||  || — || February 17, 2004 || Kitt Peak || Spacewatch ||  || align=right | 3.1 km || 
|-id=606 bgcolor=#E9E9E9
| 580606 ||  || — || February 15, 2015 || Haleakala || Pan-STARRS ||  || align=right | 1.4 km || 
|-id=607 bgcolor=#E9E9E9
| 580607 ||  || — || August 26, 2012 || Charleston || R. Holmes ||  || align=right | 1.3 km || 
|-id=608 bgcolor=#d6d6d6
| 580608 ||  || — || February 15, 2015 || Haleakala || Pan-STARRS ||  || align=right | 3.4 km || 
|-id=609 bgcolor=#d6d6d6
| 580609 ||  || — || December 22, 2008 || Kitt Peak || Spacewatch ||  || align=right | 2.3 km || 
|-id=610 bgcolor=#E9E9E9
| 580610 ||  || — || January 19, 2015 || Haleakala || Pan-STARRS ||  || align=right data-sort-value="0.87" | 870 m || 
|-id=611 bgcolor=#d6d6d6
| 580611 ||  || — || October 1, 2002 || Anderson Mesa || LONEOS ||  || align=right | 3.5 km || 
|-id=612 bgcolor=#d6d6d6
| 580612 ||  || — || November 1, 2008 || Mount Lemmon || Mount Lemmon Survey ||  || align=right | 2.0 km || 
|-id=613 bgcolor=#d6d6d6
| 580613 ||  || — || February 11, 2004 || Palomar || NEAT ||  || align=right | 2.7 km || 
|-id=614 bgcolor=#E9E9E9
| 580614 ||  || — || September 21, 2003 || Kitt Peak || Spacewatch ||  || align=right | 2.5 km || 
|-id=615 bgcolor=#d6d6d6
| 580615 ||  || — || March 3, 2009 || Catalina || CSS ||  || align=right | 4.0 km || 
|-id=616 bgcolor=#E9E9E9
| 580616 ||  || — || February 14, 2002 || Kitt Peak || Spacewatch ||  || align=right | 1.2 km || 
|-id=617 bgcolor=#E9E9E9
| 580617 ||  || — || September 26, 2013 || Mount Lemmon || Mount Lemmon Survey ||  || align=right | 1.7 km || 
|-id=618 bgcolor=#E9E9E9
| 580618 ||  || — || October 3, 2013 || Haleakala || Pan-STARRS ||  || align=right data-sort-value="0.92" | 920 m || 
|-id=619 bgcolor=#fefefe
| 580619 ||  || — || October 1, 2011 || Piszkesteto || K. Sárneczky || H || align=right data-sort-value="0.50" | 500 m || 
|-id=620 bgcolor=#fefefe
| 580620 ||  || — || March 14, 2010 || Kitt Peak || Spacewatch || H || align=right data-sort-value="0.74" | 740 m || 
|-id=621 bgcolor=#E9E9E9
| 580621 ||  || — || October 13, 1999 || Apache Point || SDSS Collaboration ||  || align=right | 1.9 km || 
|-id=622 bgcolor=#FA8072
| 580622 ||  || — || February 13, 2015 || Mount Lemmon || Mount Lemmon Survey || H || align=right data-sort-value="0.50" | 500 m || 
|-id=623 bgcolor=#d6d6d6
| 580623 ||  || — || February 15, 2015 || Haleakala || Pan-STARRS ||  || align=right | 2.7 km || 
|-id=624 bgcolor=#d6d6d6
| 580624 ||  || — || March 11, 2005 || Kitt Peak || Spacewatch ||  || align=right | 3.4 km || 
|-id=625 bgcolor=#E9E9E9
| 580625 ||  || — || April 22, 2002 || Kitt Peak || Spacewatch ||  || align=right | 2.2 km || 
|-id=626 bgcolor=#E9E9E9
| 580626 ||  || — || July 30, 2008 || Mount Lemmon || Mount Lemmon Survey ||  || align=right | 1.7 km || 
|-id=627 bgcolor=#fefefe
| 580627 ||  || — || December 8, 2010 || Mount Lemmon || Mount Lemmon Survey ||  || align=right data-sort-value="0.71" | 710 m || 
|-id=628 bgcolor=#E9E9E9
| 580628 ||  || — || August 21, 2012 || Haleakala || Pan-STARRS ||  || align=right | 1.3 km || 
|-id=629 bgcolor=#E9E9E9
| 580629 ||  || — || April 2, 2011 || Mount Lemmon || Mount Lemmon Survey ||  || align=right | 1.2 km || 
|-id=630 bgcolor=#E9E9E9
| 580630 ||  || — || January 17, 2015 || Haleakala || Pan-STARRS ||  || align=right | 1.2 km || 
|-id=631 bgcolor=#E9E9E9
| 580631 ||  || — || November 9, 2013 || Haleakala || Pan-STARRS ||  || align=right | 1.7 km || 
|-id=632 bgcolor=#E9E9E9
| 580632 ||  || — || November 3, 2004 || Palomar || NEAT ||  || align=right | 2.5 km || 
|-id=633 bgcolor=#E9E9E9
| 580633 ||  || — || February 14, 2015 || Mount Lemmon || Mount Lemmon Survey ||  || align=right | 1.8 km || 
|-id=634 bgcolor=#E9E9E9
| 580634 ||  || — || February 14, 2015 || Mount Lemmon || Mount Lemmon Survey ||  || align=right | 1.7 km || 
|-id=635 bgcolor=#fefefe
| 580635 ||  || — || February 13, 2015 || Mount Lemmon || Mount Lemmon Survey ||  || align=right data-sort-value="0.59" | 590 m || 
|-id=636 bgcolor=#E9E9E9
| 580636 ||  || — || November 10, 2013 || Mount Lemmon || Mount Lemmon Survey ||  || align=right | 1.9 km || 
|-id=637 bgcolor=#fefefe
| 580637 ||  || — || November 15, 2011 || Haleakala || Pan-STARRS || H || align=right data-sort-value="0.80" | 800 m || 
|-id=638 bgcolor=#FA8072
| 580638 ||  || — || September 20, 2011 || Haleakala || Pan-STARRS || H || align=right data-sort-value="0.48" | 480 m || 
|-id=639 bgcolor=#E9E9E9
| 580639 ||  || — || April 16, 2007 || Mount Lemmon || Mount Lemmon Survey ||  || align=right | 1.3 km || 
|-id=640 bgcolor=#E9E9E9
| 580640 ||  || — || September 5, 2008 || Kitt Peak || Spacewatch ||  || align=right | 1.9 km || 
|-id=641 bgcolor=#E9E9E9
| 580641 ||  || — || January 4, 2011 || Mount Lemmon || Mount Lemmon Survey ||  || align=right data-sort-value="0.93" | 930 m || 
|-id=642 bgcolor=#E9E9E9
| 580642 ||  || — || March 26, 2007 || Mount Lemmon || Mount Lemmon Survey ||  || align=right | 1.1 km || 
|-id=643 bgcolor=#E9E9E9
| 580643 ||  || — || November 25, 2005 || Kitt Peak || Spacewatch ||  || align=right | 1.4 km || 
|-id=644 bgcolor=#fefefe
| 580644 ||  || — || November 28, 2006 || Kitt Peak || Spacewatch ||  || align=right data-sort-value="0.83" | 830 m || 
|-id=645 bgcolor=#fefefe
| 580645 ||  || — || October 17, 2010 || Mount Lemmon || Mount Lemmon Survey ||  || align=right data-sort-value="0.68" | 680 m || 
|-id=646 bgcolor=#d6d6d6
| 580646 ||  || — || October 3, 2013 || Haleakala || Pan-STARRS ||  || align=right | 1.8 km || 
|-id=647 bgcolor=#E9E9E9
| 580647 ||  || — || January 14, 2011 || Kitt Peak || Spacewatch ||  || align=right data-sort-value="0.72" | 720 m || 
|-id=648 bgcolor=#d6d6d6
| 580648 ||  || — || April 1, 2005 || Kitt Peak || Spacewatch ||  || align=right | 2.2 km || 
|-id=649 bgcolor=#d6d6d6
| 580649 ||  || — || January 16, 2015 || Haleakala || Pan-STARRS ||  || align=right | 2.9 km || 
|-id=650 bgcolor=#fefefe
| 580650 ||  || — || February 28, 2012 || Haleakala || Pan-STARRS ||  || align=right data-sort-value="0.66" | 660 m || 
|-id=651 bgcolor=#E9E9E9
| 580651 ||  || — || January 22, 2006 || Mount Lemmon || Mount Lemmon Survey ||  || align=right | 1.9 km || 
|-id=652 bgcolor=#E9E9E9
| 580652 ||  || — || March 11, 2007 || Mount Lemmon || Mount Lemmon Survey ||  || align=right | 1.5 km || 
|-id=653 bgcolor=#fefefe
| 580653 ||  || — || October 4, 2006 || Mount Lemmon || Mount Lemmon Survey ||  || align=right data-sort-value="0.67" | 670 m || 
|-id=654 bgcolor=#E9E9E9
| 580654 ||  || — || March 4, 2011 || Mount Lemmon || Mount Lemmon Survey ||  || align=right | 1.2 km || 
|-id=655 bgcolor=#fefefe
| 580655 ||  || — || April 21, 2012 || Mount Lemmon || Mount Lemmon Survey ||  || align=right data-sort-value="0.68" | 680 m || 
|-id=656 bgcolor=#d6d6d6
| 580656 ||  || — || February 4, 2005 || Kitt Peak || Spacewatch ||  || align=right | 2.4 km || 
|-id=657 bgcolor=#E9E9E9
| 580657 ||  || — || September 4, 2008 || Kitt Peak || Spacewatch ||  || align=right | 1.8 km || 
|-id=658 bgcolor=#E9E9E9
| 580658 ||  || — || October 10, 2004 || Kitt Peak || L. H. Wasserman, J. R. Lovering ||  || align=right data-sort-value="0.64" | 640 m || 
|-id=659 bgcolor=#fefefe
| 580659 ||  || — || October 24, 2013 || Mount Lemmon || Mount Lemmon Survey ||  || align=right data-sort-value="0.59" | 590 m || 
|-id=660 bgcolor=#d6d6d6
| 580660 ||  || — || January 29, 2015 || Haleakala || Pan-STARRS ||  || align=right | 1.9 km || 
|-id=661 bgcolor=#E9E9E9
| 580661 ||  || — || April 2, 2011 || Mount Lemmon || Mount Lemmon Survey ||  || align=right | 1.6 km || 
|-id=662 bgcolor=#E9E9E9
| 580662 ||  || — || January 27, 2015 || Haleakala || Pan-STARRS ||  || align=right | 1.6 km || 
|-id=663 bgcolor=#E9E9E9
| 580663 ||  || — || May 28, 2012 || Mount Lemmon || Mount Lemmon Survey ||  || align=right | 1.9 km || 
|-id=664 bgcolor=#d6d6d6
| 580664 ||  || — || January 21, 2015 || Haleakala || Pan-STARRS ||  || align=right | 2.0 km || 
|-id=665 bgcolor=#E9E9E9
| 580665 ||  || — || October 12, 2009 || Mount Lemmon || Mount Lemmon Survey ||  || align=right | 1.2 km || 
|-id=666 bgcolor=#E9E9E9
| 580666 ||  || — || August 15, 2009 || Kitt Peak || Spacewatch ||  || align=right | 1.3 km || 
|-id=667 bgcolor=#E9E9E9
| 580667 ||  || — || February 10, 2015 || Mount Lemmon || Mount Lemmon Survey ||  || align=right data-sort-value="0.82" | 820 m || 
|-id=668 bgcolor=#E9E9E9
| 580668 ||  || — || March 5, 2006 || Mount Lemmon || Mount Lemmon Survey ||  || align=right | 1.8 km || 
|-id=669 bgcolor=#E9E9E9
| 580669 ||  || — || November 9, 2013 || Haleakala || Pan-STARRS ||  || align=right | 1.5 km || 
|-id=670 bgcolor=#E9E9E9
| 580670 ||  || — || February 16, 2015 || Haleakala || Pan-STARRS ||  || align=right | 1.4 km || 
|-id=671 bgcolor=#E9E9E9
| 580671 ||  || — || October 20, 2008 || Mount Lemmon || Mount Lemmon Survey ||  || align=right | 1.7 km || 
|-id=672 bgcolor=#E9E9E9
| 580672 ||  || — || February 16, 2015 || Haleakala || Pan-STARRS ||  || align=right | 1.1 km || 
|-id=673 bgcolor=#E9E9E9
| 580673 ||  || — || February 16, 2015 || Haleakala || Pan-STARRS ||  || align=right | 2.0 km || 
|-id=674 bgcolor=#E9E9E9
| 580674 ||  || — || January 27, 2015 || Haleakala || Pan-STARRS ||  || align=right | 1.2 km || 
|-id=675 bgcolor=#fefefe
| 580675 ||  || — || November 1, 2013 || Mount Lemmon || Mount Lemmon Survey ||  || align=right data-sort-value="0.82" | 820 m || 
|-id=676 bgcolor=#fefefe
| 580676 ||  || — || February 16, 2015 || Haleakala || Pan-STARRS ||  || align=right data-sort-value="0.75" | 750 m || 
|-id=677 bgcolor=#E9E9E9
| 580677 ||  || — || October 8, 2013 || Kitt Peak || Spacewatch ||  || align=right | 1.2 km || 
|-id=678 bgcolor=#fefefe
| 580678 ||  || — || April 30, 2008 || Kitt Peak || Spacewatch ||  || align=right data-sort-value="0.65" | 650 m || 
|-id=679 bgcolor=#E9E9E9
| 580679 ||  || — || October 2, 2008 || Mount Lemmon || Mount Lemmon Survey ||  || align=right | 1.8 km || 
|-id=680 bgcolor=#E9E9E9
| 580680 ||  || — || October 8, 2008 || Kitt Peak || Spacewatch ||  || align=right | 2.4 km || 
|-id=681 bgcolor=#d6d6d6
| 580681 ||  || — || December 3, 2008 || Mount Lemmon || Mount Lemmon Survey ||  || align=right | 2.3 km || 
|-id=682 bgcolor=#E9E9E9
| 580682 ||  || — || February 16, 2015 || Haleakala || Pan-STARRS ||  || align=right | 2.1 km || 
|-id=683 bgcolor=#d6d6d6
| 580683 ||  || — || January 21, 2015 || Haleakala || Pan-STARRS ||  || align=right | 2.1 km || 
|-id=684 bgcolor=#d6d6d6
| 580684 ||  || — || January 21, 2015 || Haleakala || Pan-STARRS ||  || align=right | 1.9 km || 
|-id=685 bgcolor=#E9E9E9
| 580685 ||  || — || September 13, 2013 || Catalina || CSS ||  || align=right | 1.8 km || 
|-id=686 bgcolor=#E9E9E9
| 580686 ||  || — || August 26, 2012 || Kitt Peak || Spacewatch ||  || align=right | 1.9 km || 
|-id=687 bgcolor=#fefefe
| 580687 ||  || — || October 20, 2006 || Kitt Peak || L. H. Wasserman ||  || align=right data-sort-value="0.87" | 870 m || 
|-id=688 bgcolor=#E9E9E9
| 580688 ||  || — || September 18, 2003 || Kitt Peak || Spacewatch ||  || align=right | 1.9 km || 
|-id=689 bgcolor=#E9E9E9
| 580689 ||  || — || August 25, 2003 || Cerro Tololo || Cerro Tololo Obs. ||  || align=right | 2.8 km || 
|-id=690 bgcolor=#E9E9E9
| 580690 ||  || — || February 16, 2015 || Haleakala || Pan-STARRS ||  || align=right | 1.7 km || 
|-id=691 bgcolor=#d6d6d6
| 580691 ||  || — || October 31, 2008 || Catalina || CSS ||  || align=right | 2.8 km || 
|-id=692 bgcolor=#E9E9E9
| 580692 ||  || — || January 21, 2015 || Haleakala || Pan-STARRS ||  || align=right | 1.2 km || 
|-id=693 bgcolor=#E9E9E9
| 580693 ||  || — || September 26, 2008 || Kitt Peak || Spacewatch ||  || align=right | 1.7 km || 
|-id=694 bgcolor=#E9E9E9
| 580694 ||  || — || May 1, 2011 || Marly || P. Kocher ||  || align=right | 2.1 km || 
|-id=695 bgcolor=#E9E9E9
| 580695 ||  || — || January 7, 2010 || Kitt Peak || Spacewatch ||  || align=right | 1.9 km || 
|-id=696 bgcolor=#E9E9E9
| 580696 ||  || — || March 4, 2006 || Kitt Peak || Spacewatch ||  || align=right | 2.0 km || 
|-id=697 bgcolor=#fefefe
| 580697 ||  || — || June 15, 2009 || Mount Lemmon || Mount Lemmon Survey ||  || align=right data-sort-value="0.82" | 820 m || 
|-id=698 bgcolor=#E9E9E9
| 580698 ||  || — || November 9, 2013 || Haleakala || Pan-STARRS ||  || align=right | 1.1 km || 
|-id=699 bgcolor=#d6d6d6
| 580699 ||  || — || January 29, 2009 || Kitt Peak || Spacewatch ||  || align=right | 2.2 km || 
|-id=700 bgcolor=#fefefe
| 580700 ||  || — || April 20, 2012 || Mount Lemmon || Mount Lemmon Survey ||  || align=right data-sort-value="0.65" | 650 m || 
|}

580701–580800 

|-bgcolor=#E9E9E9
| 580701 ||  || — || January 29, 2015 || Haleakala || Pan-STARRS ||  || align=right | 1.7 km || 
|-id=702 bgcolor=#fefefe
| 580702 ||  || — || October 27, 2005 || Mount Lemmon || Mount Lemmon Survey ||  || align=right data-sort-value="0.71" | 710 m || 
|-id=703 bgcolor=#E9E9E9
| 580703 ||  || — || November 27, 2013 || Haleakala || Pan-STARRS ||  || align=right | 1.7 km || 
|-id=704 bgcolor=#E9E9E9
| 580704 ||  || — || January 27, 2015 || Haleakala || Pan-STARRS ||  || align=right | 1.7 km || 
|-id=705 bgcolor=#E9E9E9
| 580705 ||  || — || November 24, 2009 || Kitt Peak || Spacewatch ||  || align=right | 1.4 km || 
|-id=706 bgcolor=#E9E9E9
| 580706 ||  || — || January 12, 2010 || Mount Lemmon || Mount Lemmon Survey ||  || align=right | 2.2 km || 
|-id=707 bgcolor=#E9E9E9
| 580707 ||  || — || January 29, 2015 || Haleakala || Pan-STARRS ||  || align=right | 1.9 km || 
|-id=708 bgcolor=#E9E9E9
| 580708 ||  || — || November 17, 2009 || Mount Lemmon || Mount Lemmon Survey ||  || align=right | 2.1 km || 
|-id=709 bgcolor=#E9E9E9
| 580709 ||  || — || October 14, 2013 || Kitt Peak || Spacewatch ||  || align=right | 1.0 km || 
|-id=710 bgcolor=#E9E9E9
| 580710 ||  || — || February 16, 2015 || Haleakala || Pan-STARRS ||  || align=right | 1.5 km || 
|-id=711 bgcolor=#FA8072
| 580711 ||  || — || January 21, 2015 || Haleakala || Pan-STARRS || H || align=right data-sort-value="0.43" | 430 m || 
|-id=712 bgcolor=#E9E9E9
| 580712 ||  || — || December 26, 2014 || Haleakala || Pan-STARRS ||  || align=right | 1.3 km || 
|-id=713 bgcolor=#E9E9E9
| 580713 ||  || — || August 24, 2000 || Socorro || LINEAR ||  || align=right | 1.5 km || 
|-id=714 bgcolor=#d6d6d6
| 580714 ||  || — || January 11, 2010 || Kitt Peak || Spacewatch ||  || align=right | 1.9 km || 
|-id=715 bgcolor=#d6d6d6
| 580715 ||  || — || October 25, 2008 || Kitt Peak || Spacewatch ||  || align=right | 2.4 km || 
|-id=716 bgcolor=#E9E9E9
| 580716 ||  || — || August 14, 2012 || Haleakala || Pan-STARRS ||  || align=right | 1.5 km || 
|-id=717 bgcolor=#E9E9E9
| 580717 ||  || — || January 22, 2015 || Haleakala || Pan-STARRS ||  || align=right | 1.9 km || 
|-id=718 bgcolor=#E9E9E9
| 580718 ||  || — || March 2, 2011 || Mount Lemmon || Mount Lemmon Survey ||  || align=right | 1.2 km || 
|-id=719 bgcolor=#E9E9E9
| 580719 ||  || — || March 3, 2006 || Nyukasa || H. Kurosaki, A. Nakajima ||  || align=right | 2.2 km || 
|-id=720 bgcolor=#d6d6d6
| 580720 ||  || — || October 20, 2008 || Kitt Peak || Spacewatch ||  || align=right | 2.0 km || 
|-id=721 bgcolor=#d6d6d6
| 580721 ||  || — || May 21, 2011 || Mount Lemmon || Mount Lemmon Survey ||  || align=right | 2.0 km || 
|-id=722 bgcolor=#E9E9E9
| 580722 ||  || — || May 6, 2011 || Mount Lemmon || Mount Lemmon Survey ||  || align=right | 1.5 km || 
|-id=723 bgcolor=#E9E9E9
| 580723 ||  || — || January 22, 2015 || Haleakala || Pan-STARRS ||  || align=right | 1.6 km || 
|-id=724 bgcolor=#E9E9E9
| 580724 ||  || — || February 16, 2015 || Haleakala || Pan-STARRS ||  || align=right | 1.9 km || 
|-id=725 bgcolor=#E9E9E9
| 580725 ||  || — || February 16, 2015 || Haleakala || Pan-STARRS ||  || align=right | 1.9 km || 
|-id=726 bgcolor=#E9E9E9
| 580726 ||  || — || February 25, 2006 || Mount Lemmon || Mount Lemmon Survey ||  || align=right | 1.8 km || 
|-id=727 bgcolor=#E9E9E9
| 580727 ||  || — || January 30, 2006 || Kitt Peak || Spacewatch ||  || align=right | 1.7 km || 
|-id=728 bgcolor=#E9E9E9
| 580728 ||  || — || August 26, 2012 || Haleakala || Pan-STARRS ||  || align=right | 1.7 km || 
|-id=729 bgcolor=#E9E9E9
| 580729 ||  || — || September 6, 2008 || Catalina || CSS ||  || align=right | 1.5 km || 
|-id=730 bgcolor=#E9E9E9
| 580730 ||  || — || January 30, 2006 || Kitt Peak || Spacewatch ||  || align=right | 1.8 km || 
|-id=731 bgcolor=#d6d6d6
| 580731 ||  || — || March 8, 2005 || Mount Lemmon || Mount Lemmon Survey ||  || align=right | 2.0 km || 
|-id=732 bgcolor=#fefefe
| 580732 ||  || — || January 9, 2007 || Mount Lemmon || Mount Lemmon Survey ||  || align=right data-sort-value="0.67" | 670 m || 
|-id=733 bgcolor=#d6d6d6
| 580733 ||  || — || January 16, 2005 || Mauna Kea || Mauna Kea Obs. ||  || align=right | 1.7 km || 
|-id=734 bgcolor=#fefefe
| 580734 ||  || — || November 14, 2006 || Kitt Peak || Spacewatch ||  || align=right data-sort-value="0.52" | 520 m || 
|-id=735 bgcolor=#E9E9E9
| 580735 ||  || — || December 25, 2005 || Kitt Peak || Spacewatch ||  || align=right | 1.3 km || 
|-id=736 bgcolor=#E9E9E9
| 580736 ||  || — || October 5, 2004 || Kitt Peak || Spacewatch ||  || align=right | 1.2 km || 
|-id=737 bgcolor=#E9E9E9
| 580737 ||  || — || April 14, 2011 || Mount Lemmon || Mount Lemmon Survey ||  || align=right | 2.1 km || 
|-id=738 bgcolor=#d6d6d6
| 580738 ||  || — || March 17, 2005 || Mount Lemmon || Mount Lemmon Survey ||  || align=right | 2.1 km || 
|-id=739 bgcolor=#d6d6d6
| 580739 ||  || — || September 12, 2007 || Kitt Peak || Spacewatch ||  || align=right | 2.3 km || 
|-id=740 bgcolor=#E9E9E9
| 580740 ||  || — || February 10, 2015 || Mount Lemmon || Mount Lemmon Survey ||  || align=right | 1.7 km || 
|-id=741 bgcolor=#E9E9E9
| 580741 ||  || — || January 30, 2006 || Kitt Peak || Spacewatch ||  || align=right | 1.9 km || 
|-id=742 bgcolor=#E9E9E9
| 580742 ||  || — || January 22, 2006 || Mount Lemmon || Mount Lemmon Survey ||  || align=right | 1.3 km || 
|-id=743 bgcolor=#E9E9E9
| 580743 ||  || — || September 20, 2008 || Kitt Peak || Spacewatch ||  || align=right | 1.3 km || 
|-id=744 bgcolor=#d6d6d6
| 580744 ||  || — || January 22, 2015 || Haleakala || Pan-STARRS ||  || align=right | 1.7 km || 
|-id=745 bgcolor=#E9E9E9
| 580745 ||  || — || December 28, 2005 || Kitt Peak || Spacewatch ||  || align=right | 1.1 km || 
|-id=746 bgcolor=#E9E9E9
| 580746 ||  || — || September 25, 2013 || Mount Lemmon || Mount Lemmon Survey ||  || align=right | 1.0 km || 
|-id=747 bgcolor=#E9E9E9
| 580747 ||  || — || August 29, 2000 || Socorro || LINEAR ||  || align=right | 1.0 km || 
|-id=748 bgcolor=#d6d6d6
| 580748 ||  || — || October 21, 2003 || Kitt Peak || Spacewatch ||  || align=right | 2.2 km || 
|-id=749 bgcolor=#E9E9E9
| 580749 ||  || — || September 3, 2008 || Kitt Peak || Spacewatch ||  || align=right | 2.1 km || 
|-id=750 bgcolor=#d6d6d6
| 580750 ||  || — || August 24, 2007 || Kitt Peak || Spacewatch ||  || align=right | 3.2 km || 
|-id=751 bgcolor=#d6d6d6
| 580751 ||  || — || September 13, 2012 || Mount Lemmon || Mount Lemmon Survey ||  || align=right | 2.9 km || 
|-id=752 bgcolor=#E9E9E9
| 580752 ||  || — || September 23, 2008 || Mount Lemmon || Mount Lemmon Survey ||  || align=right | 2.2 km || 
|-id=753 bgcolor=#E9E9E9
| 580753 ||  || — || October 2, 2008 || Mount Lemmon || Mount Lemmon Survey ||  || align=right | 1.8 km || 
|-id=754 bgcolor=#d6d6d6
| 580754 ||  || — || March 18, 2010 || Mount Lemmon || Mount Lemmon Survey ||  || align=right | 2.0 km || 
|-id=755 bgcolor=#E9E9E9
| 580755 ||  || — || January 31, 2006 || Kitt Peak || Spacewatch ||  || align=right | 1.1 km || 
|-id=756 bgcolor=#E9E9E9
| 580756 ||  || — || September 26, 2009 || Kitt Peak || Spacewatch ||  || align=right data-sort-value="0.67" | 670 m || 
|-id=757 bgcolor=#E9E9E9
| 580757 ||  || — || March 24, 2011 || Catalina || CSS ||  || align=right | 1.6 km || 
|-id=758 bgcolor=#E9E9E9
| 580758 ||  || — || March 13, 2011 || Kitt Peak || Spacewatch ||  || align=right | 1.6 km || 
|-id=759 bgcolor=#E9E9E9
| 580759 ||  || — || March 26, 2011 || Kitt Peak || Spacewatch ||  || align=right | 1.9 km || 
|-id=760 bgcolor=#d6d6d6
| 580760 ||  || — || February 17, 2015 || Haleakala || Pan-STARRS ||  || align=right | 2.0 km || 
|-id=761 bgcolor=#E9E9E9
| 580761 ||  || — || March 9, 2011 || Mount Lemmon || Mount Lemmon Survey ||  || align=right | 1.2 km || 
|-id=762 bgcolor=#E9E9E9
| 580762 ||  || — || March 29, 2011 || Kitt Peak || Spacewatch ||  || align=right | 1.9 km || 
|-id=763 bgcolor=#E9E9E9
| 580763 ||  || — || September 5, 2013 || Kitt Peak || Spacewatch ||  || align=right | 1.6 km || 
|-id=764 bgcolor=#E9E9E9
| 580764 ||  || — || May 27, 2012 || Mount Lemmon || Mount Lemmon Survey ||  || align=right | 1.0 km || 
|-id=765 bgcolor=#E9E9E9
| 580765 ||  || — || February 14, 2015 || Catalina || CSS ||  || align=right | 2.1 km || 
|-id=766 bgcolor=#E9E9E9
| 580766 ||  || — || January 27, 2006 || Mount Lemmon || Mount Lemmon Survey ||  || align=right | 1.9 km || 
|-id=767 bgcolor=#E9E9E9
| 580767 ||  || — || May 21, 2012 || Mount Lemmon || Mount Lemmon Survey ||  || align=right | 1.9 km || 
|-id=768 bgcolor=#E9E9E9
| 580768 ||  || — || January 21, 2015 || Mount Lemmon || Mount Lemmon Survey ||  || align=right | 1.5 km || 
|-id=769 bgcolor=#E9E9E9
| 580769 ||  || — || January 23, 2015 || Haleakala || Pan-STARRS ||  || align=right | 2.0 km || 
|-id=770 bgcolor=#E9E9E9
| 580770 ||  || — || January 23, 2015 || Haleakala || Pan-STARRS ||  || align=right | 2.1 km || 
|-id=771 bgcolor=#d6d6d6
| 580771 ||  || — || January 25, 2015 || Haleakala || Pan-STARRS ||  || align=right | 2.2 km || 
|-id=772 bgcolor=#E9E9E9
| 580772 ||  || — || May 21, 2012 || Mount Lemmon || Mount Lemmon Survey ||  || align=right | 1.1 km || 
|-id=773 bgcolor=#E9E9E9
| 580773 ||  || — || December 29, 2014 || Haleakala || Pan-STARRS ||  || align=right | 1.9 km || 
|-id=774 bgcolor=#E9E9E9
| 580774 ||  || — || December 10, 2004 || Kitt Peak || Spacewatch ||  || align=right | 2.3 km || 
|-id=775 bgcolor=#E9E9E9
| 580775 ||  || — || January 8, 2010 || Kitt Peak || Spacewatch ||  || align=right | 2.8 km || 
|-id=776 bgcolor=#E9E9E9
| 580776 ||  || — || October 29, 2000 || Kitt Peak || Spacewatch ||  || align=right | 1.5 km || 
|-id=777 bgcolor=#E9E9E9
| 580777 ||  || — || December 29, 2014 || Haleakala || Pan-STARRS ||  || align=right | 1.7 km || 
|-id=778 bgcolor=#E9E9E9
| 580778 ||  || — || August 26, 2012 || Catalina || CSS ||  || align=right | 2.5 km || 
|-id=779 bgcolor=#d6d6d6
| 580779 ||  || — || October 8, 2012 || Haleakala || Pan-STARRS ||  || align=right | 2.5 km || 
|-id=780 bgcolor=#d6d6d6
| 580780 ||  || — || March 9, 2005 || Catalina || CSS ||  || align=right | 4.3 km || 
|-id=781 bgcolor=#E9E9E9
| 580781 ||  || — || April 28, 2011 || Kitt Peak || Spacewatch ||  || align=right | 1.3 km || 
|-id=782 bgcolor=#E9E9E9
| 580782 ||  || — || November 18, 2009 || Mount Lemmon || Mount Lemmon Survey ||  || align=right | 2.0 km || 
|-id=783 bgcolor=#E9E9E9
| 580783 ||  || — || September 14, 2013 || Haleakala || Pan-STARRS ||  || align=right data-sort-value="0.84" | 840 m || 
|-id=784 bgcolor=#E9E9E9
| 580784 ||  || — || November 4, 2013 || Haleakala || Pan-STARRS || GEF || align=right | 1.1 km || 
|-id=785 bgcolor=#E9E9E9
| 580785 ||  || — || April 28, 2011 || Kitt Peak || Spacewatch ||  || align=right | 2.4 km || 
|-id=786 bgcolor=#E9E9E9
| 580786 ||  || — || December 29, 2014 || Haleakala || Pan-STARRS ||  || align=right | 1.5 km || 
|-id=787 bgcolor=#E9E9E9
| 580787 ||  || — || December 29, 2014 || Haleakala || Pan-STARRS ||  || align=right | 1.7 km || 
|-id=788 bgcolor=#E9E9E9
| 580788 ||  || — || December 26, 2009 || Kitt Peak || Spacewatch ||  || align=right | 1.9 km || 
|-id=789 bgcolor=#E9E9E9
| 580789 ||  || — || November 9, 2013 || Haleakala || Pan-STARRS ||  || align=right | 2.0 km || 
|-id=790 bgcolor=#E9E9E9
| 580790 ||  || — || February 17, 2015 || Haleakala || Pan-STARRS ||  || align=right | 2.3 km || 
|-id=791 bgcolor=#d6d6d6
| 580791 ||  || — || February 17, 2015 || Haleakala || Pan-STARRS ||  || align=right | 2.3 km || 
|-id=792 bgcolor=#d6d6d6
| 580792 ||  || — || February 17, 2015 || Haleakala || Pan-STARRS ||  || align=right | 3.0 km || 
|-id=793 bgcolor=#E9E9E9
| 580793 ||  || — || October 25, 2005 || Kitt Peak || Spacewatch ||  || align=right | 1.7 km || 
|-id=794 bgcolor=#E9E9E9
| 580794 ||  || — || January 17, 2015 || Mount Lemmon || Mount Lemmon Survey ||  || align=right | 1.9 km || 
|-id=795 bgcolor=#E9E9E9
| 580795 ||  || — || January 24, 2003 || La Silla || A. Boattini, O. R. Hainaut ||  || align=right | 1.4 km || 
|-id=796 bgcolor=#E9E9E9
| 580796 ||  || — || November 30, 2005 || Mount Lemmon || Mount Lemmon Survey ||  || align=right | 2.3 km || 
|-id=797 bgcolor=#E9E9E9
| 580797 ||  || — || October 1, 2005 || Anderson Mesa || LONEOS ||  || align=right | 1.4 km || 
|-id=798 bgcolor=#E9E9E9
| 580798 ||  || — || October 10, 2008 || Mount Lemmon || Mount Lemmon Survey ||  || align=right | 2.9 km || 
|-id=799 bgcolor=#E9E9E9
| 580799 ||  || — || November 21, 2009 || Kitt Peak || Spacewatch ||  || align=right | 2.0 km || 
|-id=800 bgcolor=#E9E9E9
| 580800 ||  || — || December 5, 2005 || Kitt Peak || Spacewatch || (5) || align=right | 1.00 km || 
|}

580801–580900 

|-bgcolor=#d6d6d6
| 580801 ||  || — || February 18, 2015 || Mount Lemmon || Mount Lemmon Survey ||  || align=right | 2.9 km || 
|-id=802 bgcolor=#d6d6d6
| 580802 ||  || — || December 29, 2013 || Haleakala || Pan-STARRS ||  || align=right | 2.8 km || 
|-id=803 bgcolor=#E9E9E9
| 580803 ||  || — || October 16, 2003 || Kitt Peak || Spacewatch ||  || align=right | 2.3 km || 
|-id=804 bgcolor=#E9E9E9
| 580804 ||  || — || September 28, 2013 || Mount Lemmon || Mount Lemmon Survey || AEO || align=right | 1.1 km || 
|-id=805 bgcolor=#fefefe
| 580805 ||  || — || November 26, 2014 || Haleakala || Pan-STARRS || H || align=right data-sort-value="0.62" | 620 m || 
|-id=806 bgcolor=#fefefe
| 580806 ||  || — || December 15, 2006 || Mount Lemmon || Mount Lemmon Survey || H || align=right data-sort-value="0.75" | 750 m || 
|-id=807 bgcolor=#fefefe
| 580807 ||  || — || November 28, 2006 || Mount Lemmon || Mount Lemmon Survey || H || align=right data-sort-value="0.75" | 750 m || 
|-id=808 bgcolor=#fefefe
| 580808 ||  || — || April 9, 2008 || Kitt Peak || Spacewatch ||  || align=right data-sort-value="0.65" | 650 m || 
|-id=809 bgcolor=#E9E9E9
| 580809 ||  || — || March 23, 2003 || Apache Point || SDSS Collaboration || EUN || align=right | 1.0 km || 
|-id=810 bgcolor=#E9E9E9
| 580810 ||  || — || March 11, 2011 || Mount Lemmon || Mount Lemmon Survey ||  || align=right | 1.4 km || 
|-id=811 bgcolor=#E9E9E9
| 580811 ||  || — || October 29, 2009 || Kitt Peak || Spacewatch ||  || align=right | 1.6 km || 
|-id=812 bgcolor=#E9E9E9
| 580812 ||  || — || September 23, 2008 || Kitt Peak || Spacewatch ||  || align=right | 1.9 km || 
|-id=813 bgcolor=#E9E9E9
| 580813 ||  || — || April 28, 2011 || Haleakala || Pan-STARRS ||  || align=right | 2.3 km || 
|-id=814 bgcolor=#E9E9E9
| 580814 ||  || — || March 2, 2011 || Kitt Peak || Spacewatch ||  || align=right | 2.4 km || 
|-id=815 bgcolor=#E9E9E9
| 580815 ||  || — || November 29, 2013 || Haleakala || Pan-STARRS ||  || align=right | 2.7 km || 
|-id=816 bgcolor=#E9E9E9
| 580816 ||  || — || January 27, 2015 || Haleakala || Pan-STARRS ||  || align=right | 1.9 km || 
|-id=817 bgcolor=#fefefe
| 580817 ||  || — || February 18, 2015 || Haleakala || Pan-STARRS ||  || align=right data-sort-value="0.75" | 750 m || 
|-id=818 bgcolor=#E9E9E9
| 580818 ||  || — || November 28, 2013 || Mount Lemmon || Mount Lemmon Survey ||  || align=right | 1.6 km || 
|-id=819 bgcolor=#d6d6d6
| 580819 ||  || — || February 18, 2015 || Haleakala || Pan-STARRS ||  || align=right | 2.2 km || 
|-id=820 bgcolor=#E9E9E9
| 580820 ||  || — || January 21, 2015 || Haleakala || Pan-STARRS ||  || align=right | 1.9 km || 
|-id=821 bgcolor=#E9E9E9
| 580821 ||  || — || September 29, 2003 || Kitt Peak || Spacewatch ||  || align=right | 2.0 km || 
|-id=822 bgcolor=#d6d6d6
| 580822 ||  || — || May 23, 2006 || Kitt Peak || Spacewatch ||  || align=right | 2.0 km || 
|-id=823 bgcolor=#d6d6d6
| 580823 ||  || — || October 14, 2007 || Mount Lemmon || Mount Lemmon Survey ||  || align=right | 2.3 km || 
|-id=824 bgcolor=#d6d6d6
| 580824 ||  || — || October 8, 2012 || Haleakala || Pan-STARRS ||  || align=right | 2.6 km || 
|-id=825 bgcolor=#E9E9E9
| 580825 ||  || — || October 30, 2005 || Mount Lemmon || Mount Lemmon Survey ||  || align=right | 1.5 km || 
|-id=826 bgcolor=#E9E9E9
| 580826 ||  || — || December 7, 2001 || Kitt Peak || Spacewatch ||  || align=right data-sort-value="0.94" | 940 m || 
|-id=827 bgcolor=#E9E9E9
| 580827 ||  || — || March 11, 2011 || Mount Lemmon || Mount Lemmon Survey || EUN || align=right | 1.2 km || 
|-id=828 bgcolor=#E9E9E9
| 580828 ||  || — || January 23, 2015 || Haleakala || Pan-STARRS ||  || align=right | 2.1 km || 
|-id=829 bgcolor=#d6d6d6
| 580829 ||  || — || January 16, 2015 || Haleakala || Pan-STARRS ||  || align=right | 2.9 km || 
|-id=830 bgcolor=#d6d6d6
| 580830 ||  || — || August 30, 2005 || Bergisch Gladbach || W. Bickel ||  || align=right | 3.5 km || 
|-id=831 bgcolor=#fefefe
| 580831 ||  || — || February 20, 2015 || Haleakala || Pan-STARRS || H || align=right data-sort-value="0.59" | 590 m || 
|-id=832 bgcolor=#E9E9E9
| 580832 ||  || — || December 25, 2009 || Kitt Peak || Spacewatch ||  || align=right | 3.0 km || 
|-id=833 bgcolor=#E9E9E9
| 580833 ||  || — || September 6, 2008 || Mount Lemmon || Mount Lemmon Survey ||  || align=right | 1.7 km || 
|-id=834 bgcolor=#E9E9E9
| 580834 ||  || — || October 5, 2004 || Kitt Peak || Spacewatch ||  || align=right | 1.2 km || 
|-id=835 bgcolor=#d6d6d6
| 580835 ||  || — || January 12, 2010 || Kitt Peak || Spacewatch || BRA || align=right | 1.6 km || 
|-id=836 bgcolor=#d6d6d6
| 580836 ||  || — || February 20, 2015 || Haleakala || Pan-STARRS ||  || align=right | 2.4 km || 
|-id=837 bgcolor=#E9E9E9
| 580837 ||  || — || October 11, 2012 || Mount Lemmon || Mount Lemmon Survey ||  || align=right | 1.8 km || 
|-id=838 bgcolor=#E9E9E9
| 580838 ||  || — || October 25, 2013 || Mount Lemmon || Mount Lemmon Survey ||  || align=right | 1.8 km || 
|-id=839 bgcolor=#E9E9E9
| 580839 ||  || — || November 1, 2013 || Kitt Peak || Spacewatch ||  || align=right | 1.4 km || 
|-id=840 bgcolor=#d6d6d6
| 580840 ||  || — || January 27, 2015 || Haleakala || Pan-STARRS ||  || align=right | 2.3 km || 
|-id=841 bgcolor=#d6d6d6
| 580841 ||  || — || May 26, 2011 || Kitt Peak || Spacewatch ||  || align=right | 2.9 km || 
|-id=842 bgcolor=#E9E9E9
| 580842 ||  || — || August 12, 2013 || Haleakala || Pan-STARRS ||  || align=right data-sort-value="0.99" | 990 m || 
|-id=843 bgcolor=#E9E9E9
| 580843 ||  || — || July 20, 2004 || Siding Spring || SSS ||  || align=right | 2.1 km || 
|-id=844 bgcolor=#d6d6d6
| 580844 ||  || — || January 16, 2015 || Haleakala || Pan-STARRS ||  || align=right | 3.2 km || 
|-id=845 bgcolor=#fefefe
| 580845 ||  || — || June 18, 2013 || Mount Lemmon || Mount Lemmon Survey || H || align=right data-sort-value="0.56" | 560 m || 
|-id=846 bgcolor=#FA8072
| 580846 ||  || — || October 9, 2008 || Mount Lemmon || Mount Lemmon Survey ||  || align=right data-sort-value="0.52" | 520 m || 
|-id=847 bgcolor=#d6d6d6
| 580847 ||  || — || November 9, 2013 || Mount Lemmon || Mount Lemmon Survey ||  || align=right | 1.7 km || 
|-id=848 bgcolor=#E9E9E9
| 580848 ||  || — || August 23, 2003 || Cerro Tololo || Cerro Tololo Obs. ||  || align=right | 1.6 km || 
|-id=849 bgcolor=#E9E9E9
| 580849 ||  || — || April 22, 2011 || Kitt Peak || Spacewatch ||  || align=right | 1.2 km || 
|-id=850 bgcolor=#d6d6d6
| 580850 ||  || — || December 4, 2008 || Kitt Peak || Spacewatch ||  || align=right | 2.3 km || 
|-id=851 bgcolor=#d6d6d6
| 580851 ||  || — || September 14, 2007 || Mauna Kea || Mauna Kea Obs. || EOS || align=right | 1.5 km || 
|-id=852 bgcolor=#d6d6d6
| 580852 ||  || — || November 26, 2013 || Mount Lemmon || Mount Lemmon Survey ||  || align=right | 2.0 km || 
|-id=853 bgcolor=#E9E9E9
| 580853 ||  || — || December 18, 2009 || Mount Lemmon || Mount Lemmon Survey ||  || align=right | 2.3 km || 
|-id=854 bgcolor=#d6d6d6
| 580854 ||  || — || May 15, 2005 || Palomar || NEAT ||  || align=right | 2.3 km || 
|-id=855 bgcolor=#d6d6d6
| 580855 ||  || — || January 30, 2015 || Haleakala || Pan-STARRS ||  || align=right | 2.3 km || 
|-id=856 bgcolor=#d6d6d6
| 580856 ||  || — || March 22, 2009 || Catalina || CSS ||  || align=right | 3.6 km || 
|-id=857 bgcolor=#fefefe
| 580857 ||  || — || February 21, 2007 || Mount Lemmon || Mount Lemmon Survey ||  || align=right data-sort-value="0.85" | 850 m || 
|-id=858 bgcolor=#fefefe
| 580858 ||  || — || February 13, 2004 || Palomar || NEAT || H || align=right data-sort-value="0.91" | 910 m || 
|-id=859 bgcolor=#E9E9E9
| 580859 ||  || — || October 12, 2009 || Mount Lemmon || Mount Lemmon Survey ||  || align=right data-sort-value="0.94" | 940 m || 
|-id=860 bgcolor=#fefefe
| 580860 ||  || — || October 26, 2008 || Kitt Peak || Spacewatch || H || align=right data-sort-value="0.78" | 780 m || 
|-id=861 bgcolor=#E9E9E9
| 580861 ||  || — || February 24, 2015 || Haleakala || Pan-STARRS ||  || align=right | 1.0 km || 
|-id=862 bgcolor=#d6d6d6
| 580862 ||  || — || December 31, 2008 || Kitt Peak || Spacewatch ||  || align=right | 2.6 km || 
|-id=863 bgcolor=#E9E9E9
| 580863 ||  || — || January 20, 2015 || Haleakala || Pan-STARRS ||  || align=right | 1.7 km || 
|-id=864 bgcolor=#E9E9E9
| 580864 ||  || — || December 6, 2013 || Haleakala || Pan-STARRS ||  || align=right | 1.4 km || 
|-id=865 bgcolor=#E9E9E9
| 580865 ||  || — || October 31, 2005 || Mauna Kea || Mauna Kea Obs. ||  || align=right | 2.5 km || 
|-id=866 bgcolor=#d6d6d6
| 580866 ||  || — || January 2, 2009 || Kitt Peak || Spacewatch ||  || align=right | 2.7 km || 
|-id=867 bgcolor=#d6d6d6
| 580867 ||  || — || September 10, 2007 || Kitt Peak || Spacewatch ||  || align=right | 2.3 km || 
|-id=868 bgcolor=#E9E9E9
| 580868 ||  || — || March 16, 2001 || Kitt Peak || Spacewatch ||  || align=right | 2.5 km || 
|-id=869 bgcolor=#fefefe
| 580869 ||  || — || February 18, 2015 || Haleakala || Pan-STARRS || H || align=right data-sort-value="0.66" | 660 m || 
|-id=870 bgcolor=#fefefe
| 580870 ||  || — || March 9, 2002 || Palomar || NEAT || H || align=right data-sort-value="0.74" | 740 m || 
|-id=871 bgcolor=#d6d6d6
| 580871 ||  || — || August 14, 2012 || Haleakala || Pan-STARRS ||  || align=right | 3.2 km || 
|-id=872 bgcolor=#d6d6d6
| 580872 ||  || — || April 2, 2005 || Mount Lemmon || Mount Lemmon Survey ||  || align=right | 2.1 km || 
|-id=873 bgcolor=#d6d6d6
| 580873 ||  || — || October 19, 2007 || Mount Lemmon || Mount Lemmon Survey ||  || align=right | 2.0 km || 
|-id=874 bgcolor=#E9E9E9
| 580874 ||  || — || November 8, 2013 || Kitt Peak || Spacewatch ||  || align=right | 1.5 km || 
|-id=875 bgcolor=#E9E9E9
| 580875 ||  || — || February 18, 2015 || Haleakala || Pan-STARRS ||  || align=right | 1.6 km || 
|-id=876 bgcolor=#E9E9E9
| 580876 ||  || — || August 24, 2008 || Kitt Peak || Spacewatch ||  || align=right | 2.5 km || 
|-id=877 bgcolor=#d6d6d6
| 580877 ||  || — || October 16, 2012 || Mount Lemmon || Mount Lemmon Survey ||  || align=right | 2.0 km || 
|-id=878 bgcolor=#d6d6d6
| 580878 ||  || — || April 15, 2010 || Mount Lemmon || Mount Lemmon Survey ||  || align=right | 2.1 km || 
|-id=879 bgcolor=#d6d6d6
| 580879 ||  || — || March 29, 2009 || Siding Spring || SSS ||  || align=right | 3.7 km || 
|-id=880 bgcolor=#E9E9E9
| 580880 ||  || — || August 26, 2012 || Haleakala || Pan-STARRS ||  || align=right | 1.7 km || 
|-id=881 bgcolor=#d6d6d6
| 580881 ||  || — || January 27, 2004 || Kitt Peak || Spacewatch ||  || align=right | 1.7 km || 
|-id=882 bgcolor=#E9E9E9
| 580882 ||  || — || February 16, 2015 || Haleakala || Pan-STARRS ||  || align=right | 1.7 km || 
|-id=883 bgcolor=#d6d6d6
| 580883 ||  || — || December 1, 2008 || Kitt Peak || Spacewatch ||  || align=right | 1.9 km || 
|-id=884 bgcolor=#fefefe
| 580884 ||  || — || February 17, 2015 || Haleakala || Pan-STARRS ||  || align=right data-sort-value="0.86" | 860 m || 
|-id=885 bgcolor=#d6d6d6
| 580885 ||  || — || January 28, 2015 || Haleakala || Pan-STARRS ||  || align=right | 2.3 km || 
|-id=886 bgcolor=#d6d6d6
| 580886 ||  || — || June 29, 2005 || Kitt Peak || Spacewatch ||  || align=right | 3.3 km || 
|-id=887 bgcolor=#fefefe
| 580887 ||  || — || February 18, 2015 || Kitt Peak || Spacewatch ||  || align=right data-sort-value="0.69" | 690 m || 
|-id=888 bgcolor=#E9E9E9
| 580888 ||  || — || February 20, 2015 || Haleakala || Pan-STARRS ||  || align=right | 1.0 km || 
|-id=889 bgcolor=#E9E9E9
| 580889 ||  || — || February 27, 2015 || Haleakala || Pan-STARRS ||  || align=right | 1.1 km || 
|-id=890 bgcolor=#d6d6d6
| 580890 ||  || — || February 16, 2015 || Haleakala || Pan-STARRS ||  || align=right | 2.2 km || 
|-id=891 bgcolor=#d6d6d6
| 580891 ||  || — || February 20, 2015 || Haleakala || Pan-STARRS ||  || align=right | 2.5 km || 
|-id=892 bgcolor=#E9E9E9
| 580892 ||  || — || February 27, 2015 || Mount Lemmon || Mount Lemmon Survey ||  || align=right | 1.6 km || 
|-id=893 bgcolor=#d6d6d6
| 580893 ||  || — || February 24, 2015 || Haleakala || Pan-STARRS ||  || align=right | 1.9 km || 
|-id=894 bgcolor=#E9E9E9
| 580894 ||  || — || February 16, 2015 || Haleakala || Pan-STARRS ||  || align=right | 1.6 km || 
|-id=895 bgcolor=#d6d6d6
| 580895 ||  || — || February 26, 2015 || Mount Lemmon || Mount Lemmon Survey ||  || align=right | 2.0 km || 
|-id=896 bgcolor=#E9E9E9
| 580896 ||  || — || February 18, 2015 || XuYi || PMO NEO ||  || align=right | 1.9 km || 
|-id=897 bgcolor=#d6d6d6
| 580897 ||  || — || February 20, 2015 || Haleakala || Pan-STARRS ||  || align=right | 2.2 km || 
|-id=898 bgcolor=#d6d6d6
| 580898 ||  || — || February 18, 2015 || Haleakala || Pan-STARRS ||  || align=right | 2.0 km || 
|-id=899 bgcolor=#E9E9E9
| 580899 ||  || — || February 20, 2015 || Mount Lemmon || Mount Lemmon Survey ||  || align=right | 1.7 km || 
|-id=900 bgcolor=#C2FFFF
| 580900 ||  || — || February 18, 2015 || Haleakala || Pan-STARRS || L4 || align=right | 6.9 km || 
|}

580901–581000 

|-bgcolor=#d6d6d6
| 580901 ||  || — || February 16, 2015 || Haleakala || Pan-STARRS ||  || align=right | 2.2 km || 
|-id=902 bgcolor=#E9E9E9
| 580902 ||  || — || February 27, 2015 || Mount Lemmon || Mount Lemmon Survey ||  || align=right | 1.4 km || 
|-id=903 bgcolor=#d6d6d6
| 580903 ||  || — || February 23, 2015 || Haleakala || Pan-STARRS ||  || align=right | 3.1 km || 
|-id=904 bgcolor=#d6d6d6
| 580904 ||  || — || February 27, 2015 || Haleakala || Pan-STARRS ||  || align=right | 2.2 km || 
|-id=905 bgcolor=#fefefe
| 580905 ||  || — || March 3, 2015 || Haleakala || Pan-STARRS || H || align=right data-sort-value="0.55" | 550 m || 
|-id=906 bgcolor=#E9E9E9
| 580906 ||  || — || March 9, 2002 || Kitt Peak || Spacewatch ||  || align=right | 1.8 km || 
|-id=907 bgcolor=#E9E9E9
| 580907 ||  || — || March 10, 2015 || Cerro Paranal || M. Altmann, T. Prusti ||  || align=right | 1.8 km || 
|-id=908 bgcolor=#E9E9E9
| 580908 ||  || — || February 16, 2015 || Haleakala || Pan-STARRS ||  || align=right | 1.5 km || 
|-id=909 bgcolor=#E9E9E9
| 580909 ||  || — || January 21, 2015 || Haleakala || Pan-STARRS ||  || align=right | 1.2 km || 
|-id=910 bgcolor=#E9E9E9
| 580910 ||  || — || May 1, 2011 || Haleakala || Pan-STARRS ||  || align=right | 2.5 km || 
|-id=911 bgcolor=#E9E9E9
| 580911 ||  || — || October 16, 2013 || Mount Lemmon || Mount Lemmon Survey ||  || align=right | 2.1 km || 
|-id=912 bgcolor=#E9E9E9
| 580912 ||  || — || October 24, 2005 || Mauna Kea || Mauna Kea Obs. ||  || align=right | 1.9 km || 
|-id=913 bgcolor=#E9E9E9
| 580913 ||  || — || October 20, 2008 || Mount Lemmon || Mount Lemmon Survey ||  || align=right | 1.9 km || 
|-id=914 bgcolor=#fefefe
| 580914 ||  || — || March 14, 2015 || Haleakala || Pan-STARRS || H || align=right data-sort-value="0.62" | 620 m || 
|-id=915 bgcolor=#fefefe
| 580915 ||  || — || March 9, 2008 || Kitt Peak || Spacewatch ||  || align=right data-sort-value="0.62" | 620 m || 
|-id=916 bgcolor=#fefefe
| 580916 ||  || — || June 6, 2008 || Kitt Peak || Spacewatch ||  || align=right data-sort-value="0.75" | 750 m || 
|-id=917 bgcolor=#E9E9E9
| 580917 ||  || — || December 5, 2005 || Mount Lemmon || Mount Lemmon Survey ||  || align=right | 1.6 km || 
|-id=918 bgcolor=#E9E9E9
| 580918 ||  || — || November 4, 2004 || Kitt Peak || Spacewatch ||  || align=right | 2.4 km || 
|-id=919 bgcolor=#E9E9E9
| 580919 ||  || — || October 16, 2009 || Mount Lemmon || Mount Lemmon Survey ||  || align=right data-sort-value="0.73" | 730 m || 
|-id=920 bgcolor=#E9E9E9
| 580920 ||  || — || March 13, 2011 || Mount Lemmon || Mount Lemmon Survey ||  || align=right | 1.5 km || 
|-id=921 bgcolor=#fefefe
| 580921 ||  || — || March 29, 2012 || Haleakala || Pan-STARRS ||  || align=right data-sort-value="0.71" | 710 m || 
|-id=922 bgcolor=#E9E9E9
| 580922 ||  || — || January 23, 2015 || Haleakala || Pan-STARRS ||  || align=right | 1.9 km || 
|-id=923 bgcolor=#E9E9E9
| 580923 ||  || — || September 28, 2009 || Mount Lemmon || Mount Lemmon Survey ||  || align=right data-sort-value="0.80" | 800 m || 
|-id=924 bgcolor=#E9E9E9
| 580924 ||  || — || October 24, 2013 || Mount Lemmon || Mount Lemmon Survey ||  || align=right | 1.7 km || 
|-id=925 bgcolor=#E9E9E9
| 580925 ||  || — || June 23, 2007 || Kitt Peak || Spacewatch ||  || align=right | 1.8 km || 
|-id=926 bgcolor=#E9E9E9
| 580926 ||  || — || February 2, 2006 || Kitt Peak || Spacewatch ||  || align=right | 2.2 km || 
|-id=927 bgcolor=#fefefe
| 580927 ||  || — || January 18, 2015 || Haleakala || Pan-STARRS ||  || align=right data-sort-value="0.75" | 750 m || 
|-id=928 bgcolor=#d6d6d6
| 580928 ||  || — || March 11, 2015 || Kitt Peak || Spacewatch ||  || align=right | 1.9 km || 
|-id=929 bgcolor=#fefefe
| 580929 ||  || — || October 3, 2013 || Haleakala || Pan-STARRS ||  || align=right data-sort-value="0.76" | 760 m || 
|-id=930 bgcolor=#E9E9E9
| 580930 ||  || — || February 1, 2006 || Kitt Peak || Spacewatch ||  || align=right | 1.7 km || 
|-id=931 bgcolor=#E9E9E9
| 580931 ||  || — || March 29, 2001 || Kitt Peak || Spacewatch ||  || align=right | 2.6 km || 
|-id=932 bgcolor=#E9E9E9
| 580932 ||  || — || October 8, 2008 || Kitt Peak || Spacewatch ||  || align=right | 1.8 km || 
|-id=933 bgcolor=#E9E9E9
| 580933 ||  || — || January 19, 2015 || Mount Lemmon || Mount Lemmon Survey ||  || align=right | 2.2 km || 
|-id=934 bgcolor=#E9E9E9
| 580934 ||  || — || February 17, 2015 || Haleakala || Pan-STARRS ||  || align=right | 1.6 km || 
|-id=935 bgcolor=#E9E9E9
| 580935 ||  || — || March 14, 2015 || Haleakala || Pan-STARRS ||  || align=right | 1.5 km || 
|-id=936 bgcolor=#E9E9E9
| 580936 ||  || — || September 22, 2008 || Kitt Peak || Spacewatch ||  || align=right | 1.8 km || 
|-id=937 bgcolor=#E9E9E9
| 580937 ||  || — || September 24, 2012 || Mount Lemmon || Mount Lemmon Survey ||  || align=right | 1.9 km || 
|-id=938 bgcolor=#d6d6d6
| 580938 ||  || — || January 29, 2015 || Haleakala || Pan-STARRS ||  || align=right | 2.2 km || 
|-id=939 bgcolor=#E9E9E9
| 580939 ||  || — || August 26, 2005 || Palomar || NEAT ||  || align=right data-sort-value="0.98" | 980 m || 
|-id=940 bgcolor=#E9E9E9
| 580940 ||  || — || October 27, 2008 || Mount Lemmon || Mount Lemmon Survey ||  || align=right | 1.7 km || 
|-id=941 bgcolor=#d6d6d6
| 580941 ||  || — || March 18, 2010 || Kitt Peak || Spacewatch ||  || align=right | 1.9 km || 
|-id=942 bgcolor=#E9E9E9
| 580942 ||  || — || November 28, 2013 || Mount Lemmon || Mount Lemmon Survey ||  || align=right | 1.2 km || 
|-id=943 bgcolor=#E9E9E9
| 580943 ||  || — || October 8, 2008 || Kitt Peak || Spacewatch ||  || align=right | 1.5 km || 
|-id=944 bgcolor=#E9E9E9
| 580944 ||  || — || April 29, 2011 || Mount Lemmon || Mount Lemmon Survey ||  || align=right | 1.8 km || 
|-id=945 bgcolor=#E9E9E9
| 580945 ||  || — || January 29, 2015 || Haleakala || Pan-STARRS ||  || align=right | 1.2 km || 
|-id=946 bgcolor=#E9E9E9
| 580946 ||  || — || November 9, 2013 || Haleakala || Pan-STARRS ||  || align=right | 1.8 km || 
|-id=947 bgcolor=#E9E9E9
| 580947 ||  || — || October 24, 2005 || Mauna Kea || Mauna Kea Obs. ||  || align=right | 2.4 km || 
|-id=948 bgcolor=#E9E9E9
| 580948 ||  || — || March 10, 2002 || Kitt Peak || Spacewatch ||  || align=right | 1.8 km || 
|-id=949 bgcolor=#d6d6d6
| 580949 ||  || — || October 11, 2012 || Haleakala || Pan-STARRS ||  || align=right | 2.4 km || 
|-id=950 bgcolor=#E9E9E9
| 580950 ||  || — || May 26, 2011 || Mount Lemmon || Mount Lemmon Survey ||  || align=right | 1.8 km || 
|-id=951 bgcolor=#E9E9E9
| 580951 ||  || — || September 2, 2008 || Kitt Peak || Spacewatch ||  || align=right | 1.7 km || 
|-id=952 bgcolor=#E9E9E9
| 580952 ||  || — || August 12, 2004 || Palomar || NEAT ||  || align=right | 1.9 km || 
|-id=953 bgcolor=#E9E9E9
| 580953 ||  || — || October 7, 2008 || Kitt Peak || Spacewatch ||  || align=right | 1.9 km || 
|-id=954 bgcolor=#E9E9E9
| 580954 ||  || — || February 16, 2015 || Haleakala || Pan-STARRS ||  || align=right | 1.6 km || 
|-id=955 bgcolor=#E9E9E9
| 580955 ||  || — || August 26, 2003 || Cerro Tololo || Cerro Tololo Obs. ||  || align=right | 2.0 km || 
|-id=956 bgcolor=#E9E9E9
| 580956 ||  || — || April 26, 2006 || Mount Lemmon || Mount Lemmon Survey ||  || align=right | 1.8 km || 
|-id=957 bgcolor=#E9E9E9
| 580957 ||  || — || September 27, 2003 || Kitt Peak || Spacewatch ||  || align=right | 2.1 km || 
|-id=958 bgcolor=#E9E9E9
| 580958 ||  || — || February 24, 2015 || Haleakala || Pan-STARRS ||  || align=right | 1.3 km || 
|-id=959 bgcolor=#E9E9E9
| 580959 ||  || — || October 4, 2013 || Haleakala || Pan-STARRS ||  || align=right | 1.3 km || 
|-id=960 bgcolor=#E9E9E9
| 580960 ||  || — || November 7, 2005 || Mauna Kea || Mauna Kea Obs. ||  || align=right | 1.2 km || 
|-id=961 bgcolor=#E9E9E9
| 580961 ||  || — || September 18, 2003 || Kitt Peak || Spacewatch ||  || align=right | 2.0 km || 
|-id=962 bgcolor=#E9E9E9
| 580962 ||  || — || August 24, 2008 || Kitt Peak || Spacewatch ||  || align=right | 1.6 km || 
|-id=963 bgcolor=#E9E9E9
| 580963 ||  || — || April 6, 2011 || Mount Lemmon || Mount Lemmon Survey ||  || align=right | 1.6 km || 
|-id=964 bgcolor=#fefefe
| 580964 ||  || — || March 14, 2015 || Haleakala || Pan-STARRS ||  || align=right data-sort-value="0.88" | 880 m || 
|-id=965 bgcolor=#E9E9E9
| 580965 ||  || — || November 2, 2005 || Mount Lemmon || Mount Lemmon Survey ||  || align=right | 1.0 km || 
|-id=966 bgcolor=#E9E9E9
| 580966 ||  || — || September 28, 2008 || Catalina || CSS ||  || align=right | 2.4 km || 
|-id=967 bgcolor=#E9E9E9
| 580967 ||  || — || March 25, 2011 || Kitt Peak || Spacewatch ||  || align=right | 2.0 km || 
|-id=968 bgcolor=#E9E9E9
| 580968 ||  || — || January 30, 2006 || Kitt Peak || Spacewatch ||  || align=right | 1.7 km || 
|-id=969 bgcolor=#E9E9E9
| 580969 ||  || — || January 23, 2015 || Haleakala || Pan-STARRS ||  || align=right | 2.3 km || 
|-id=970 bgcolor=#d6d6d6
| 580970 ||  || — || December 29, 2014 || Haleakala || Pan-STARRS ||  || align=right | 2.0 km || 
|-id=971 bgcolor=#E9E9E9
| 580971 ||  || — || November 9, 2013 || Haleakala || Pan-STARRS ||  || align=right | 1.8 km || 
|-id=972 bgcolor=#d6d6d6
| 580972 ||  || — || May 11, 2010 || Mount Lemmon || Mount Lemmon Survey ||  || align=right | 2.3 km || 
|-id=973 bgcolor=#d6d6d6
| 580973 ||  || — || June 14, 2010 || Mount Lemmon || Mount Lemmon Survey ||  || align=right | 3.4 km || 
|-id=974 bgcolor=#E9E9E9
| 580974 ||  || — || October 25, 2013 || Kitt Peak || Spacewatch ||  || align=right | 2.0 km || 
|-id=975 bgcolor=#d6d6d6
| 580975 ||  || — || January 20, 2015 || Haleakala || Pan-STARRS ||  || align=right | 1.9 km || 
|-id=976 bgcolor=#d6d6d6
| 580976 ||  || — || April 7, 2006 || Kitt Peak || Spacewatch ||  || align=right | 2.0 km || 
|-id=977 bgcolor=#d6d6d6
| 580977 ||  || — || March 8, 2005 || Mount Lemmon || Mount Lemmon Survey ||  || align=right | 2.0 km || 
|-id=978 bgcolor=#E9E9E9
| 580978 ||  || — || February 10, 2011 || Mount Lemmon || Mount Lemmon Survey ||  || align=right | 1.5 km || 
|-id=979 bgcolor=#E9E9E9
| 580979 ||  || — || January 29, 2015 || Haleakala || Pan-STARRS ||  || align=right | 1.6 km || 
|-id=980 bgcolor=#fefefe
| 580980 ||  || — || February 16, 2015 || Haleakala || Pan-STARRS ||  || align=right data-sort-value="0.55" | 550 m || 
|-id=981 bgcolor=#E9E9E9
| 580981 ||  || — || November 7, 2005 || Mauna Kea || Mauna Kea Obs. ||  || align=right | 1.9 km || 
|-id=982 bgcolor=#E9E9E9
| 580982 ||  || — || March 14, 2015 || Haleakala || Pan-STARRS ||  || align=right | 1.4 km || 
|-id=983 bgcolor=#E9E9E9
| 580983 ||  || — || October 15, 2013 || Kitt Peak || Spacewatch ||  || align=right | 1.3 km || 
|-id=984 bgcolor=#E9E9E9
| 580984 ||  || — || October 28, 2008 || Kitt Peak || Spacewatch ||  || align=right | 1.7 km || 
|-id=985 bgcolor=#E9E9E9
| 580985 ||  || — || January 26, 2015 || Haleakala || Pan-STARRS ||  || align=right | 1.8 km || 
|-id=986 bgcolor=#fefefe
| 580986 ||  || — || January 20, 2015 || Haleakala || Pan-STARRS || H || align=right data-sort-value="0.58" | 580 m || 
|-id=987 bgcolor=#fefefe
| 580987 ||  || — || March 15, 2015 || Mount Lemmon || Mount Lemmon Survey || H || align=right data-sort-value="0.67" | 670 m || 
|-id=988 bgcolor=#d6d6d6
| 580988 ||  || — || January 28, 2004 || Kitt Peak || Spacewatch ||  || align=right | 2.0 km || 
|-id=989 bgcolor=#fefefe
| 580989 ||  || — || March 14, 2015 || Mount Lemmon || Mount Lemmon Survey || H || align=right data-sort-value="0.58" | 580 m || 
|-id=990 bgcolor=#fefefe
| 580990 ||  || — || February 17, 2007 || Kitt Peak || Spacewatch || H || align=right data-sort-value="0.48" | 480 m || 
|-id=991 bgcolor=#E9E9E9
| 580991 ||  || — || April 1, 2011 || Kitt Peak || Spacewatch ||  || align=right | 1.8 km || 
|-id=992 bgcolor=#d6d6d6
| 580992 ||  || — || November 9, 2013 || Haleakala || Pan-STARRS ||  || align=right | 2.1 km || 
|-id=993 bgcolor=#E9E9E9
| 580993 ||  || — || November 29, 2014 || Haleakala || Pan-STARRS ||  || align=right | 1.6 km || 
|-id=994 bgcolor=#d6d6d6
| 580994 ||  || — || December 26, 2014 || Haleakala || Pan-STARRS ||  || align=right | 2.9 km || 
|-id=995 bgcolor=#E9E9E9
| 580995 ||  || — || October 11, 2004 || Kitt Peak || Spacewatch ||  || align=right | 2.4 km || 
|-id=996 bgcolor=#d6d6d6
| 580996 ||  || — || October 9, 2013 || Mount Lemmon || Mount Lemmon Survey ||  || align=right | 2.1 km || 
|-id=997 bgcolor=#E9E9E9
| 580997 ||  || — || January 19, 2015 || Mount Lemmon || Mount Lemmon Survey ||  || align=right | 1.3 km || 
|-id=998 bgcolor=#d6d6d6
| 580998 ||  || — || January 16, 2015 || Haleakala || Pan-STARRS ||  || align=right | 1.9 km || 
|-id=999 bgcolor=#fefefe
| 580999 ||  || — || January 20, 2015 || Mount Lemmon || Mount Lemmon Survey || H || align=right data-sort-value="0.49" | 490 m || 
|-id=000 bgcolor=#E9E9E9
| 581000 ||  || — || October 3, 2013 || Haleakala || Pan-STARRS ||  || align=right | 1.2 km || 
|}

References

External links 
 Discovery Circumstances: Numbered Minor Planets (580001)–(585000) (IAU Minor Planet Center)

0580